= Architecture of Washington, D.C. =

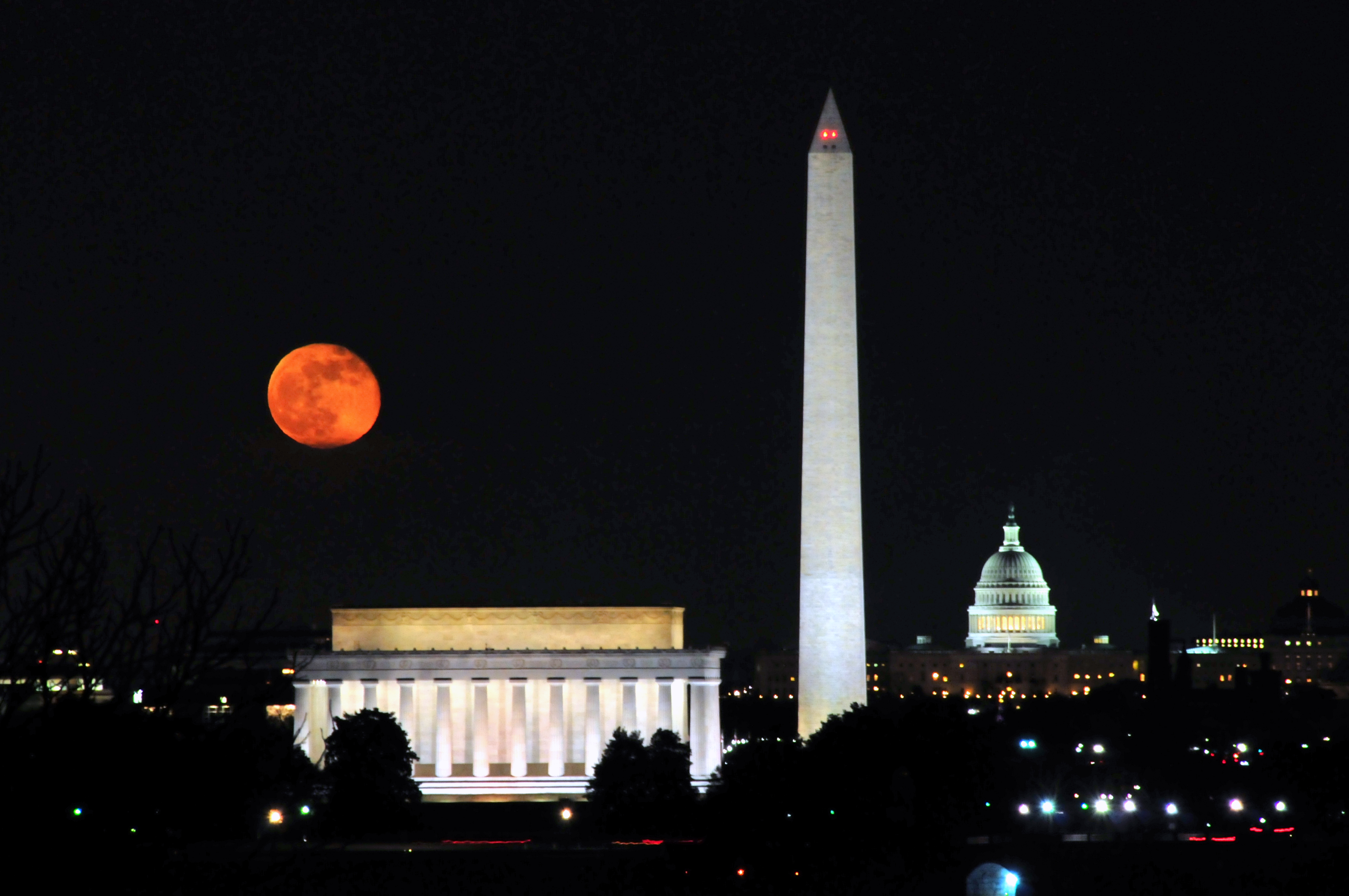
Three iconic, classically inspired American landmarks on the National Mall illuminated at night: the Lincoln Memorial (forefront), the Washington Monument, and the United States Capitol (background)

Washington, D.C., the capital of the United States, features government, monumental, commercial, and residential buildings designed across multiple eras in many different architectural styles.

Due to the city's political and historic importance, the architectural motifs found throughout the city encompass a diverse range of styles. The city is most famous for its Neoclassical government buildings, monuments, and memorials. Located mostly Downtown and along the National Mall and Tidal Basin, these buildings, inspired from ancient Rome and Greece, were designed to capture the power, strength, and grandeur of the U.S. government while honoring the political and philosophical thinkers and leaders upon which the nation was developed. These structures have large pediments, classical columns, domes, and classical statues and reliefs often made of stone or marble.

Although the Height of Buildings Act limits the upward trajectory of its buildings, many architects have contributed to the city's architectural character by intersecting creativity with practicality without surpassing the city's height limits. As such, unlike nearly all large American cities, Washington, D.C. has no skyscrapers. However, the city is home to notable examples of many important architectural movements of the 20th and 21st centuries, most notably Beaux-Arts, Brutalism, and Postmodernism.

In addition to historic Neoclassical government buildings, monuments, and memorials, Washington, D.C. is also famous for its museums and non-Neoclassically inspired memorials. The city's museums and modern memorials are some of the most visited sites in the United States and have inspired the creation of other architecturally important structures throughout the world.

== History ==
=== 18th century ===
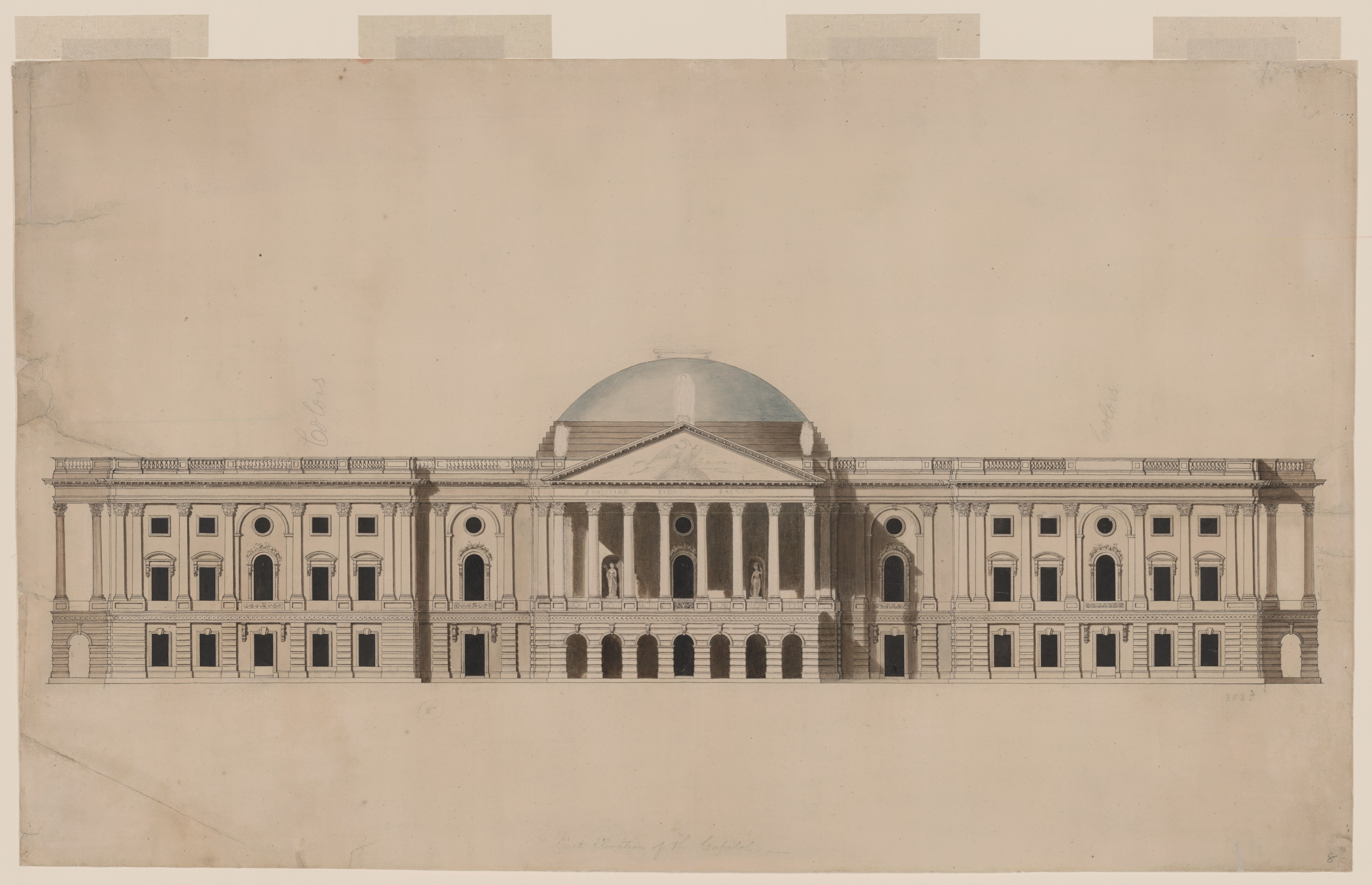
The winning design for the U.S. Capitol by William Thornton

Washington, D.C. is a planned city. It was chosen by George Washington as the site for the capital city for the new nation. In 1791, President Washington chose Frenchman Pierre L'Enfant to design the plan for the new city. L'Enfant created the L'Enfant Plan to map out the city's streets. As outlined in the plan, D.C. is a grid city, with streets running east to west and north to south with diagonal roads crossing at certain intervals. The United States Capitol is at the center of the grid, and the point at which the city is divided into four quadrants. Depending on one's relation to the Capitol, one is either in Northeast D.C., Southeast D.C., Southwest D.C., or Northwest D.C. L'Enfant's plan called for the President's House and Capitol to be near the center of the city.

The City of Washington was largely underdeveloped for decades following its founding, with the exception of government buildings, small neighborhoods, and taverns. Early in the city's founding, a competition was announced to determine the designs for the President's House and the U.S. Capitol. William Thornton, whose design received approval from George Washington and Thomas Jefferson, created the winning design for the Capitol. The design was simpler than other entrants, but spoke to the power and grandeur of the U.S. government with its Neoclassical construction. Thornton's winning submission was modified by architects Benjamin Henry Latrobe and Charles Bulfinch. Originally, the dome of the Capitol was a simple rotunda sitting atop a portico, composed of a pediment with Corinthian columns, flanked by two wings.

The design for the new President's Mansion was also determined following a design competition. Irish-American James Hoban created the winning Neoclassical design. Hoban's White House design was inspired by several European buildings, particularly buildings in France and his native Ireland. The southern portico, for example, was inspired by the Château de Rastignac in France. Both the White House and Capitol were completed in November 1800.

=== 19th century ===
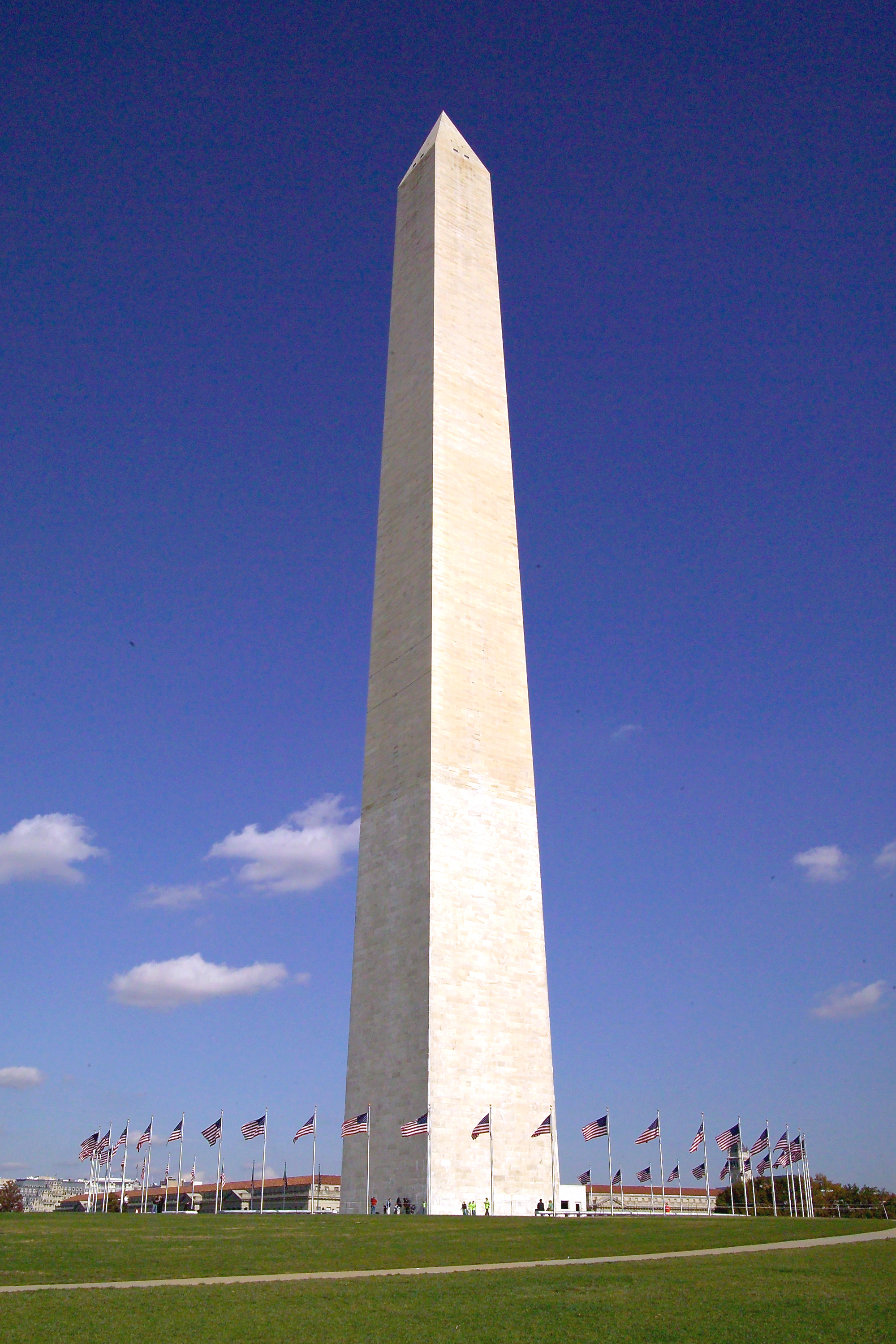
Upon its completion in 1884, the Washington Monument was the tallest man-made structure in the world at a height of 555 feet.

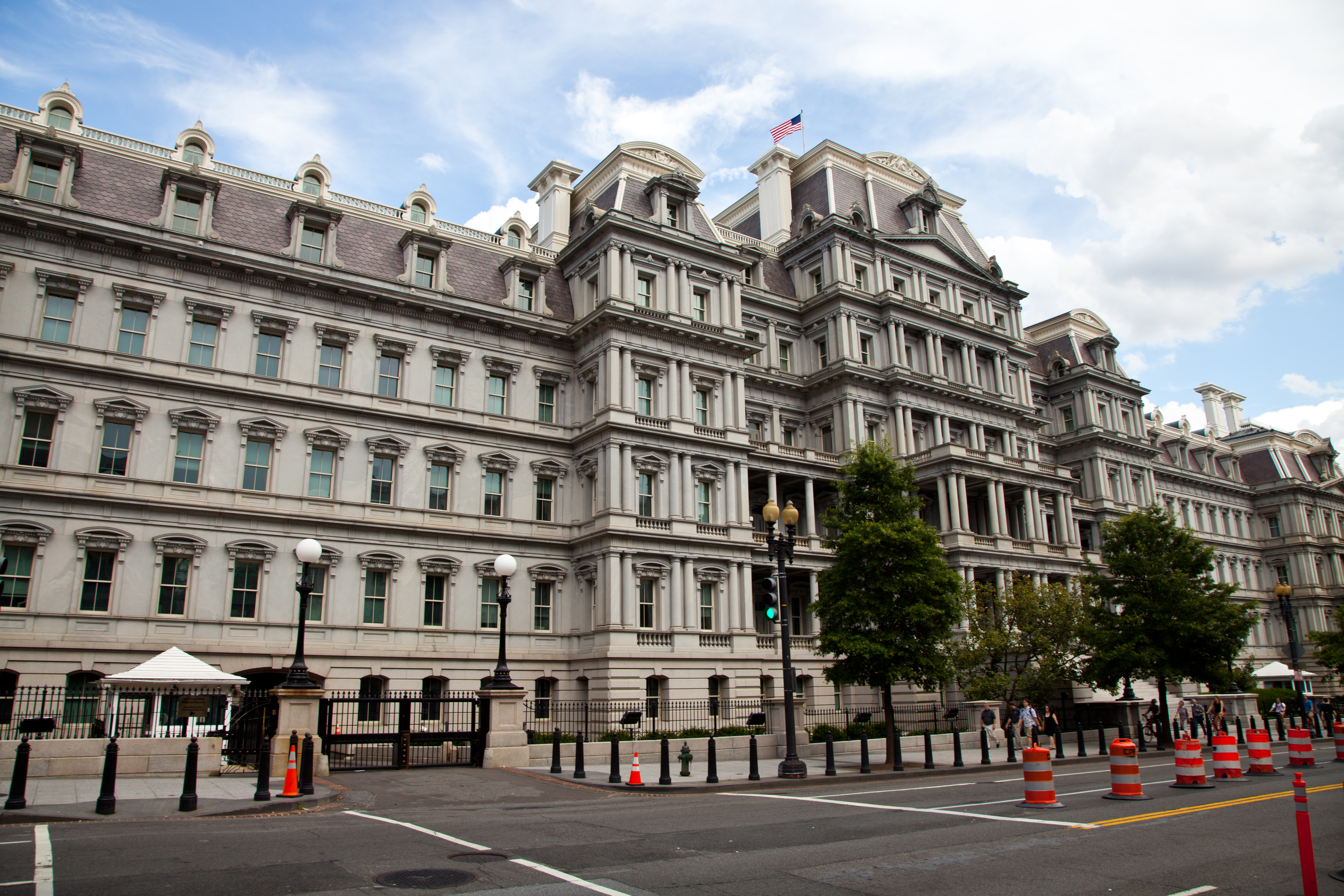
The Eisenhower Executive Office Building, built in the French Second Empire style, was ridiculed for decades for its unique design.

The Great Hall of the Thomas Jefferson Building of the Library of Congress depicts the ornate elements of Beaux-Arts architecture.

Through the early- to mid-1800s, much of the city outside central Washington, D.C. remained heavily underdeveloped, but an increasing number of Federal-style houses and public buildings were being constructed, especially on Lafayette Square. Along Pennsylvania Avenue, the diagonal road branching northwest from the Capitol to the White House, more construction was occurring, mostly for journalists covering politics in the city. Newspaper Row, as this area was called, remained an active district for newspaper companies until the National Press Building was built in 1927 and consolidated many newspapers into one building.

The mid-1800s saw two landmark architectural projects take shape. In order to account for the growing representation in Congress, the two wings of the Capitol building were expanded. Following this, it was determined that the dome needed to be enlarged as well. The current dome of the building was designed to have a far more intricate pattern than the original and was completed in 1866. The current dome was built in cast iron, with an exterior dome sitting on an interior one.

Shortly after George Washington's death in 1799, proposals were presented to create a monument in his honor in the capital. Robert Mills created the winning design in 1836, though it was simplified significantly due to increasing costs. The obelisk design was begun in 1848 and continued until about one-third of the structure was complete in 1854, at which point funding ran out. The Washington Monument stood in this unfinished state until construction resumed in 1879 and was completed in 1884. At the time of its completion, the Washington Monument was the tallest man-made structure in the world at a height of 555 feet.

The mid- to late-1800s saw many Victorian homes be built around the city, particularly in the Capitol Hill neighborhood and in Northwest Washington. This period also saw the construction of Romanesque Revival architecture, including the Smithsonian Institution Building and the Arts and Industries Building. The Old Post Office, also designed in this style, was built on Pennsylvania Avenue in 1899 with the hope that it would transform Washington into a city that could rival European capitals, most notably London and Paris, in its architectural prowess. The Old Post Office was the first building in the city to be made of a steel frame and the first to have electrical wiring.

Popular European architectural movements inspired many American buildings throughout the 1800s. One such building was the Renwick Gallery near the White House. It was built between 1859 and 1873, and was created to be Washington, D.C.'s first art museum. The structure was designed in the French Second Empire Style by architect James Renwick Jr., who designed the structure to be a miniature version of the Louvre in Paris. So similar were the façades of the two buildings that the Renwick was known as "The American Louvre" upon completion. Unlike the Louvre, however, the Renwick is made of red brick.

A second notable public building in the city constructed in the French Second Empire Style is the Eisenhower Executive Office Building. Sitting directly west of the White House, the building houses much of the president's staff. The structure was designed by Alfred B. Mullett and built between 1871 and 1888. Like many buildings of the Second Empire Style, the Eisenhower Building has numerous columns, windows, and chimneys in symmetrical relation to one another. The unique and radical design in a city used to Neoclassical and more traditional architecture led to it being widely criticized for decades after its completion. The widespread criticism was fueled by the media, which mocked Mullett relentlessly for his design of this and other Second Empire buildings. This public ridicule, combined with severe financial difficulties, led Mullett to commit suicide in Washington in 1890.

The extravagant Beaux-Arts architecture became popular in the late 1800s through the early 1900s, as did Gothic Revival. Beaux-Arts buildings in the city include the Thomas Jefferson Building of the Library of Congress, completed in 1897. This is an example of some of the most elaborate art and architecture of the American Renaissance and captures the ornate elements of the Beaux-Arts motif with elaborate interior designs that are among the richest in the United States. The building contains many busts and statues to American political, social, and intellectual leaders inside the main reading room and great hall as well as on the western façade of the building.

Although Gothic Revival architecture was most popular in the 1800s, the most famous Gothic Revival structure in the city—the Washington National Cathedral—was not built until the turn of the 20th century. The building is made of a long nine-bay nave, five-bay chancel, and six-bay transept. The exterior includes three towers, numerous flying buttresses, and gargoyles. The interior also includes statues and stained glass windows to American political icons, such as George Washington. Although talk of constructing a national cathedral date back to the city's founding, construction was not begun until 1906, and was not complete until 1988.

=== 20th century ===
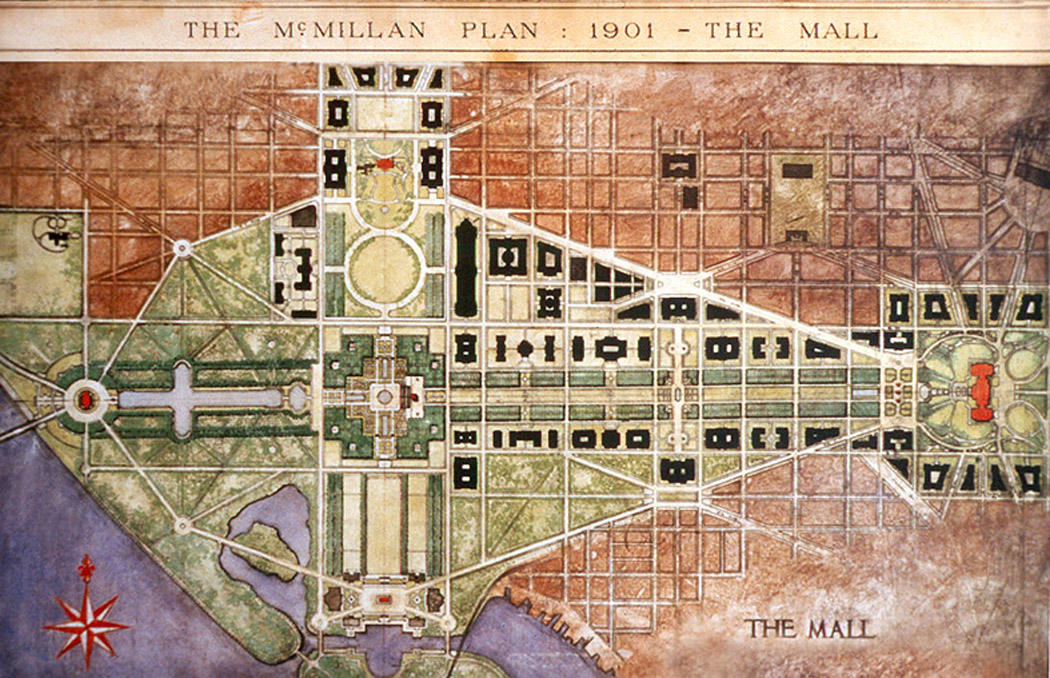
The McMillan Plan of 1902 was implemented piecemeal over the 20th century.

In the early 1900s, a movement to beautify American cities, known as the "city beautiful movement", led to the construction of new architectural plans for many American cities. The McMillan Plan was written in 1902 by the Senate Park Commission in an attempt to beautify Washington, D.C. The plan included a general design for what is now the National Mall, including the construction of public buildings along the grassy lawns of the mall. The plan called for the elimination of the Victorian-era landscape design of the mall, instead opening it up and allowing pedestrian traffic to easily move east to west. Although the plan was never fully adopted, it was implemented piecemeal in the subsequent decades. The plan succeeded in opening up the mall and extending it westward toward the banks of the Potomac River. It also succeeded in moving public constructions to the Tidal Basin. Parts of the plan that were never built include a public garden at the base of the Washington Monument as well as a Neoclassical building across Lafayette Square.

In 1910, the Height of Buildings Act of 1910 was passed by the 61st US Congress to limit the height of buildings in the city. This act was passed following the construction of the 1894 Cairo apartment building, which raised concerns that buildings of such height made it difficult to fight a potential building fire. Although the city's height limit has been altered over the years, it remains in place, despite controversy from both architects who claim it limits the possible architectural design of the city's buildings and by those claiming that it increases housing costs.

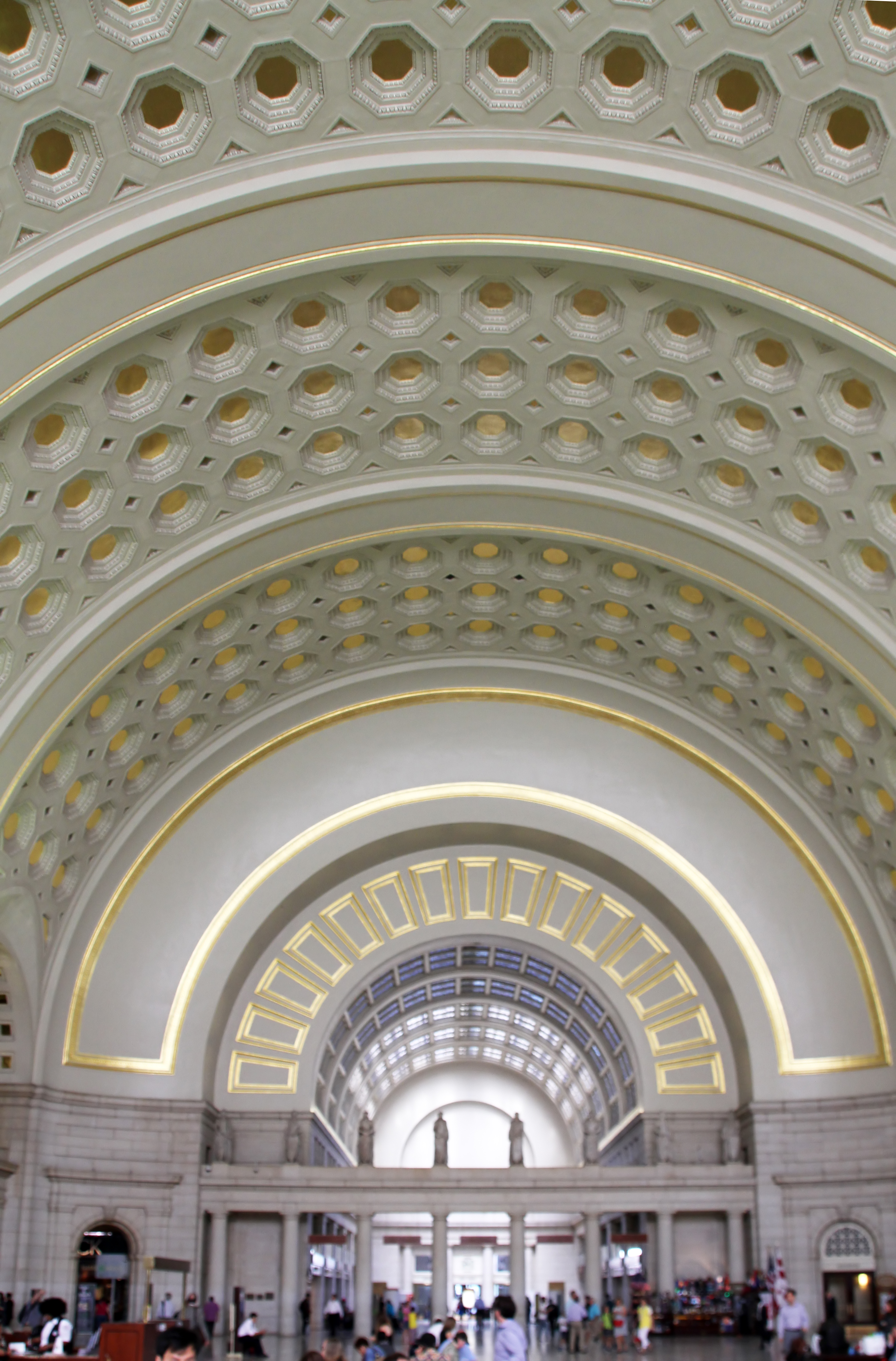
Great Hall of Union Station

Washington Union Station, the city's main train station, opened in 1908. It was designed by Daniel H. Burnham, who used numerous architectural styles to create the structure. The ceiling of the Great Hall is made of gold leaf symmetrical patterns, while neoclassical elements, such as columns and statues, line the interior and exterior of the building.

The Lincoln Memorial, designed by Henry Bacon, was inaugurated in 1922. Many different proposals for this memorial were presented in various locations across the city. In the end, a Neoclassical temple with a large statue of a sitting Abraham Lincoln was chosen to be placed directly west of the Washington Monument. In 1923, a reflecting pool was placed between these two structures. The Jefferson Memorial, another Neoclassical temple, was completed in 1943 to honor Thomas Jefferson, and was placed on the southern side of the Tidal Basin, directly south of the White House.

Washington's rise as a city of global importance through the mid- to late-1900s coincided with the popularity of Brutalism, an architectural style noted for its simplicity and use of concrete. As a result, many of the city's government buildings and museums built between the 1950s and 1980s are in the Brutalist motif. Designed by Gordon Bunshaft, the Hirshhorn Museum on the National Mall is perhaps the most famous of these. This building is a perfectly symmetrical circular concrete structure with an internal courtyard. Designed by Harry Weese, the interior ceiling of the Washington Metro is also constructed in the Brutalist style. The first of these underground stations opened in 1976.

Modernism and Postmodernism grew in popularity in the latter half of the 1900s. Defined by flat surfaces that play with light and shadow, numerous Modernist buildings exist in central Washington, including a couple Smithsonian museums. Both the National Air and Space Museum as well as the National Museum of American History include elements of Modernism in their designs. Famed Modernist architect I.M. Pei designed the East Building of the National Gallery of Art along the mall as well as the pyramids in its courtyard. Another notable Modernist building is the Kennedy Center for the Performing Arts, designed by Edward Durell Stone and completed in 1971 along the banks of the Potomac River.

The Vietnam Veterans Memorial, designed by Maya Lin, is a stripped-down, minimalist memorial in-line with Modernist architecture that opened in 1982. This memorial seeks to focus the attention of the Vietnam War not on the complicated and unpopular political decisions taken during the conflict, but rather on the people who died in combat. As such, the memorial is a simple dog-leg wall made of reflective stone upon which are engraved the names of those who died in the war. The Korean War Veterans Memorial, which opened in 1995, similarly includes a reflective wall, though with images of soldiers, as well as statues representing soldiers walking through fields.

=== 21st century ===
Contemporary architecture has been built throughout the city in the 21st century. The most notable locations where this architecture has taken root include Downtown (including CityCenterDC), Navy Yard, Buzzard Point, and the Wharf. A growth in residential apartments as well as shops and restaurants in these dense areas has allowed for the construction of contemporary buildings with glass and metal façades that have more dynamic designs common of 21st-century architecture found in many major cities.

== Architectural styles in Washington, D.C. ==
=== Neoclassical ===
Neoclassical architecture revived classical Greek and classical Roman architecture by emphasizing the construction of columns in the classical order, domes, pediments, obelisks, and buildings made of stone. New technology and altering tastes, however, allowed Neoclassical structures to surpass the size and engineering complexity of its classical predecessors. Due to the close affiliation of classical architecture with ancient political ideology as well as with power and strength, this style is popular among important government buildings across the world.

This is Washington's most recognizable architectural style. Many of the city's most prominent and historic government buildings, memorials, monuments, and museums are built in the Neoclassical motif. Many of these buildings are located on the National Mall and the Tidal Basin. Among these buildings are the White House, United States Capitol, the Washington Monument, the West Building of the National Gallery of Art, the Lincoln Memorial, and the Jefferson Memorial.

Other notable buildings built in the Neoclassical style are the Treasury Building, located immediately east of the White House, the United States Supreme Court Building located immediately east of the Capitol, Farmers and Mechanics Bank in Georgetown, the Duke Ellington School of the Arts in Georgetown, the Old Patent Office Building in Chinatown, DAR Constitution Hall located Downtown, the Jamie L. Whitten Building off the National Mall, and many government buildings in Federal Triangle, including the Andrew W. Mellon Auditorium and the National Archives Building, and the future New Stadium at RFK Campus in Hill East.

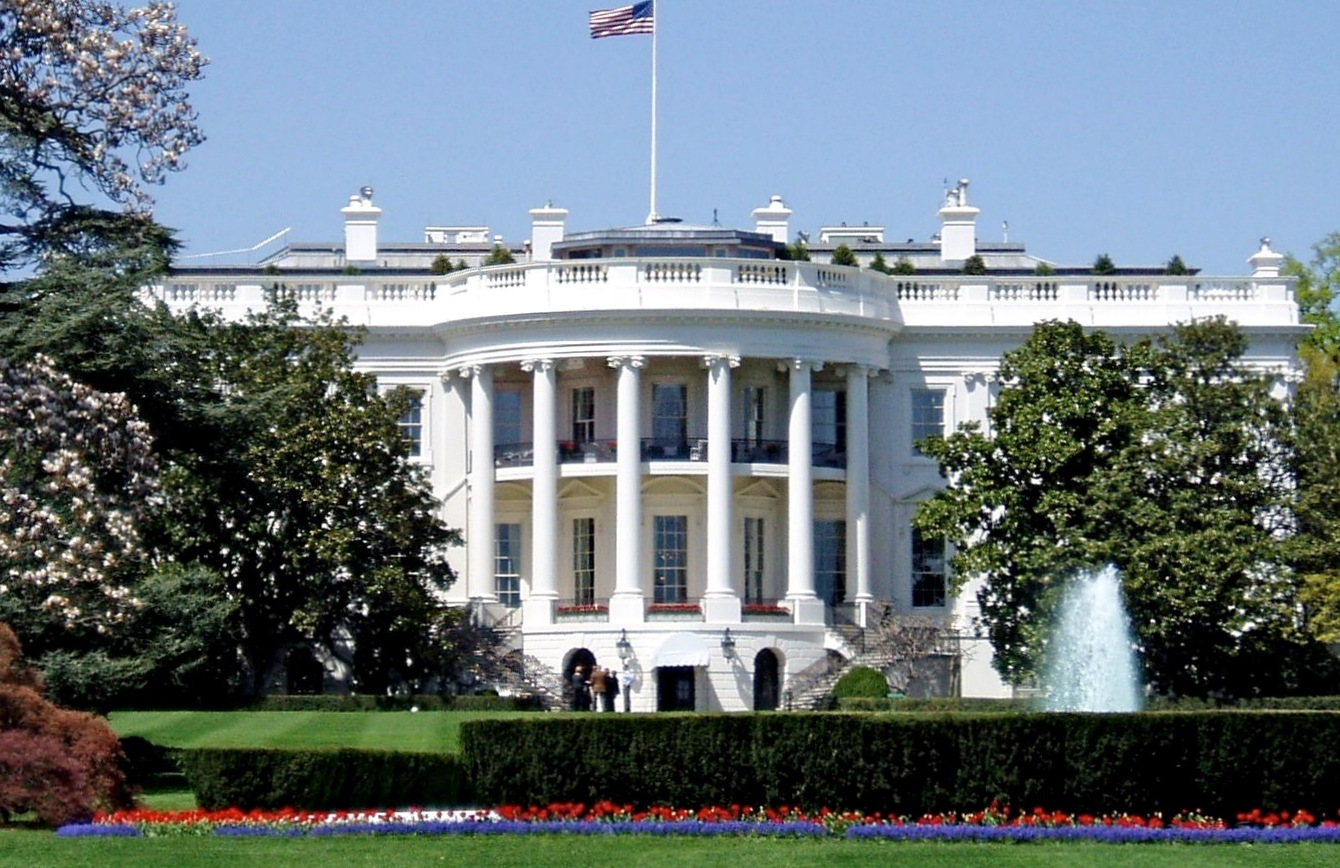
South façade of the White House (1800)

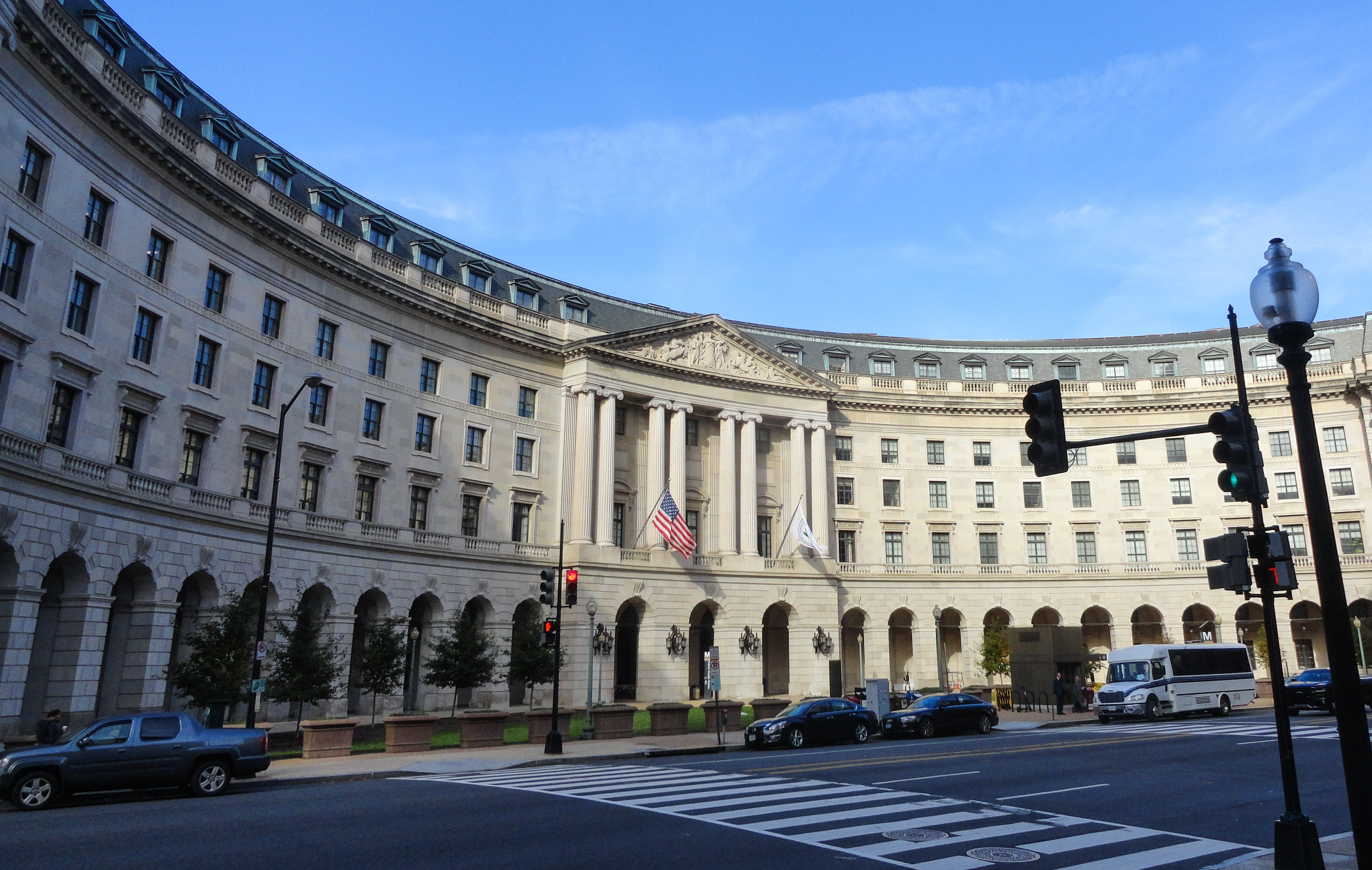
William J. Clinton Building (1934)

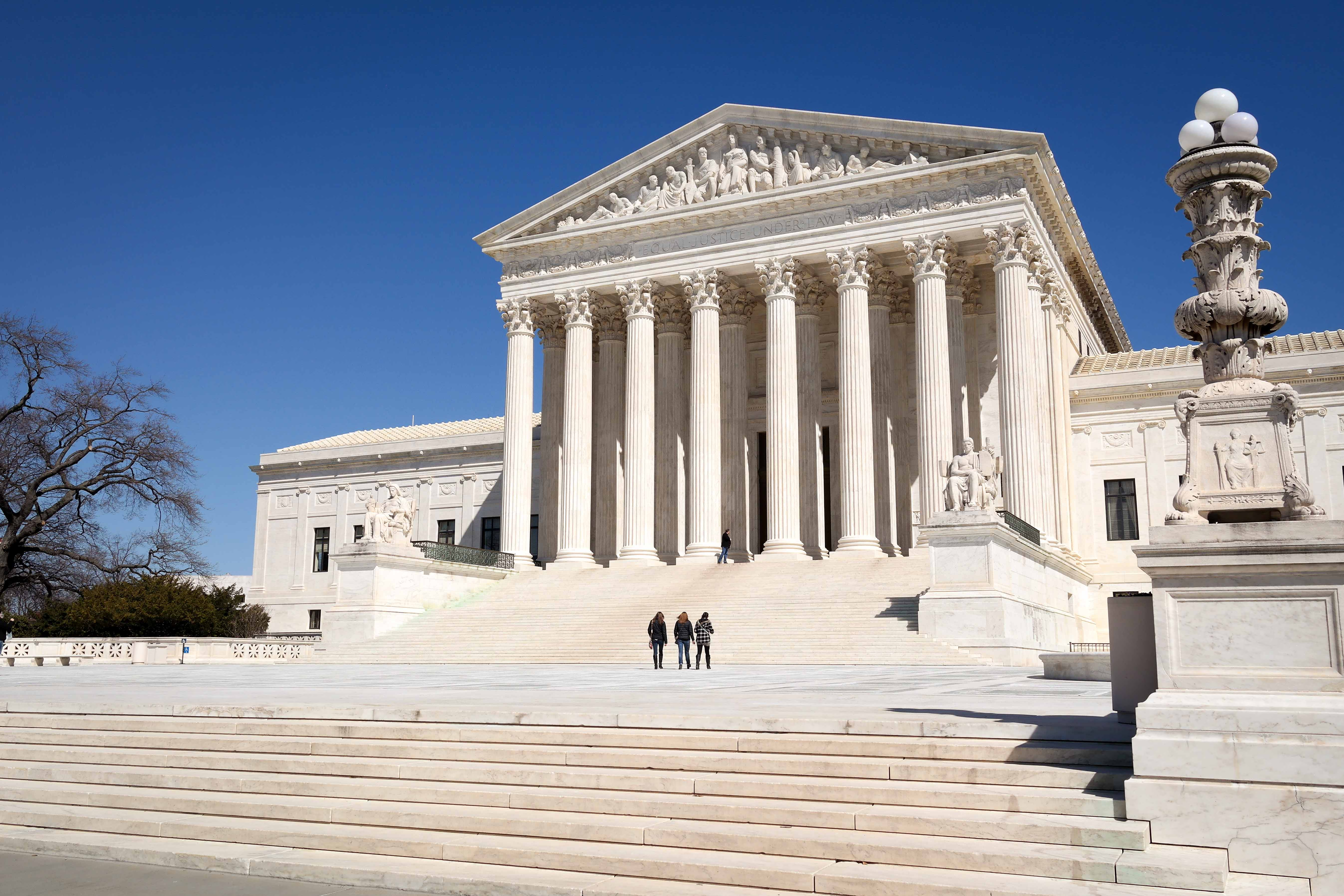
Supreme Court Building (1935)

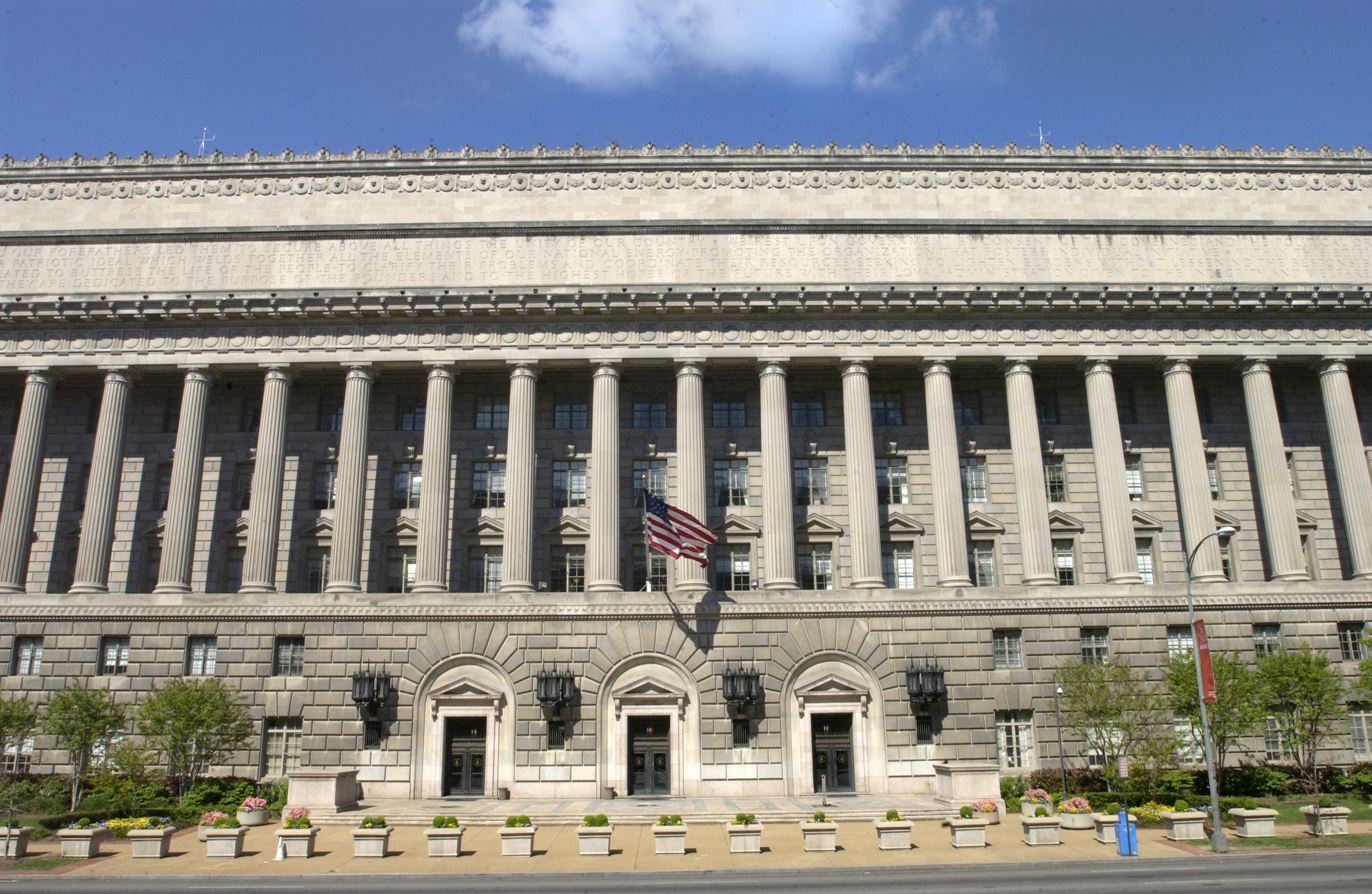
Herbert C. Hoover Building (1932)

=== Federal ===
Federal architecture traces its roots to the Federalist Era of American history. With the oldest examples of Federal architecture being constructed in the 18th century, this architectural style is found mostly in the oldest neighborhoods in the city, such as Georgetown and Lafayette Square. Federal architecture is defined by plain surfaces and facades with a limited use of pilasters. Some federal-style building combine the simple brick-based Georgian architecture with elements of classical design, such as columns and pediments. Most, however, lack these classically inspired elements and are simpler in design.

Examples of Federal buildings in the city include the Cutts-Madison House on Lafayette Square, the Blair House on Lafayette Square, the City Tavern in Georgetown, Dumbarton Oaks in Georgetown, the Thomas Law House on the Southwest Waterfront, St. John's Episcopal Church off Lafayette Square, the Benjamin Ogle Tayloe House on Lafayette Square, the Octagon House in Foggy Bottom, the Petersen House located Downtown, and the Mary E. Surratt Boarding House in Chinatown.

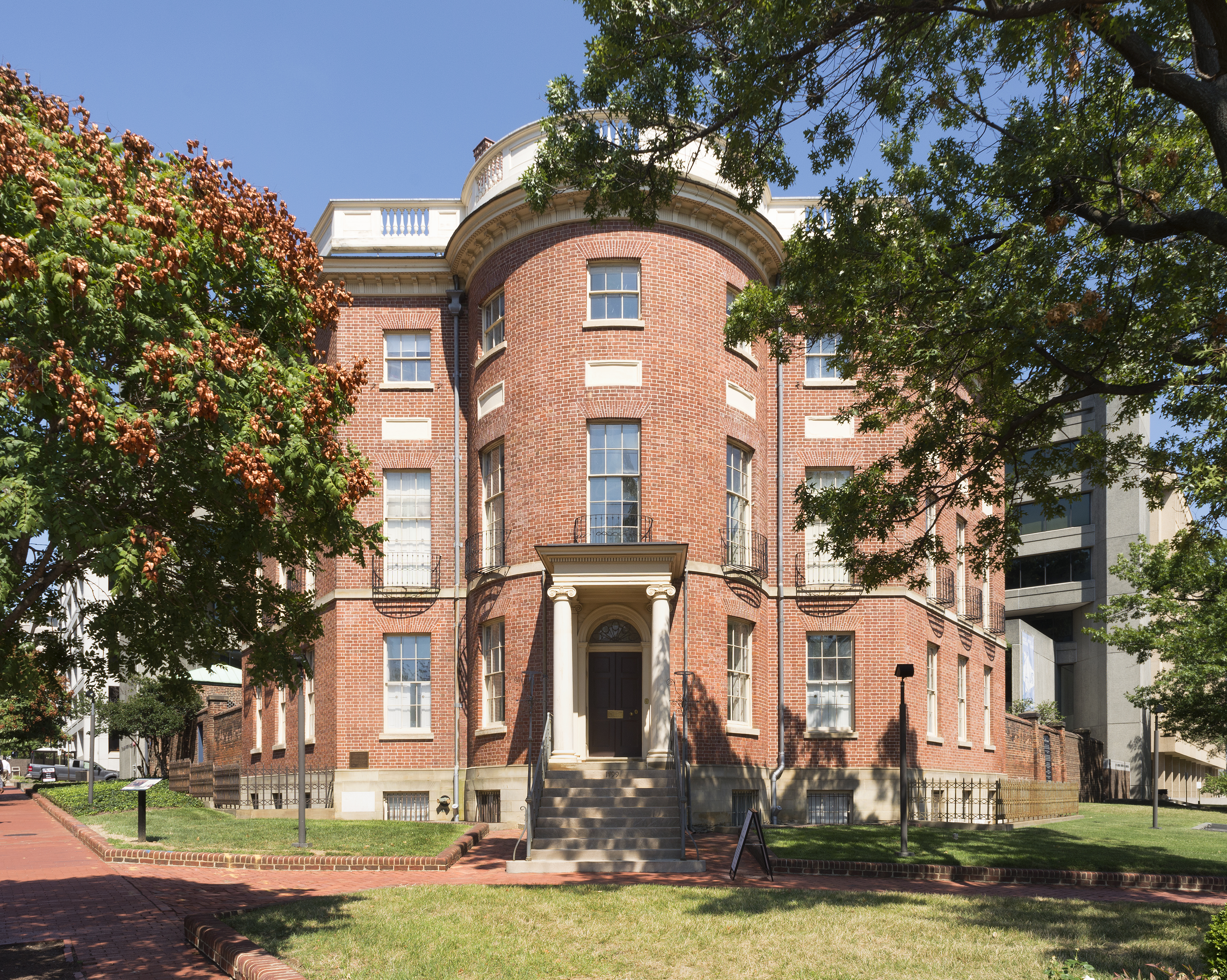
The Octagon House (1799)

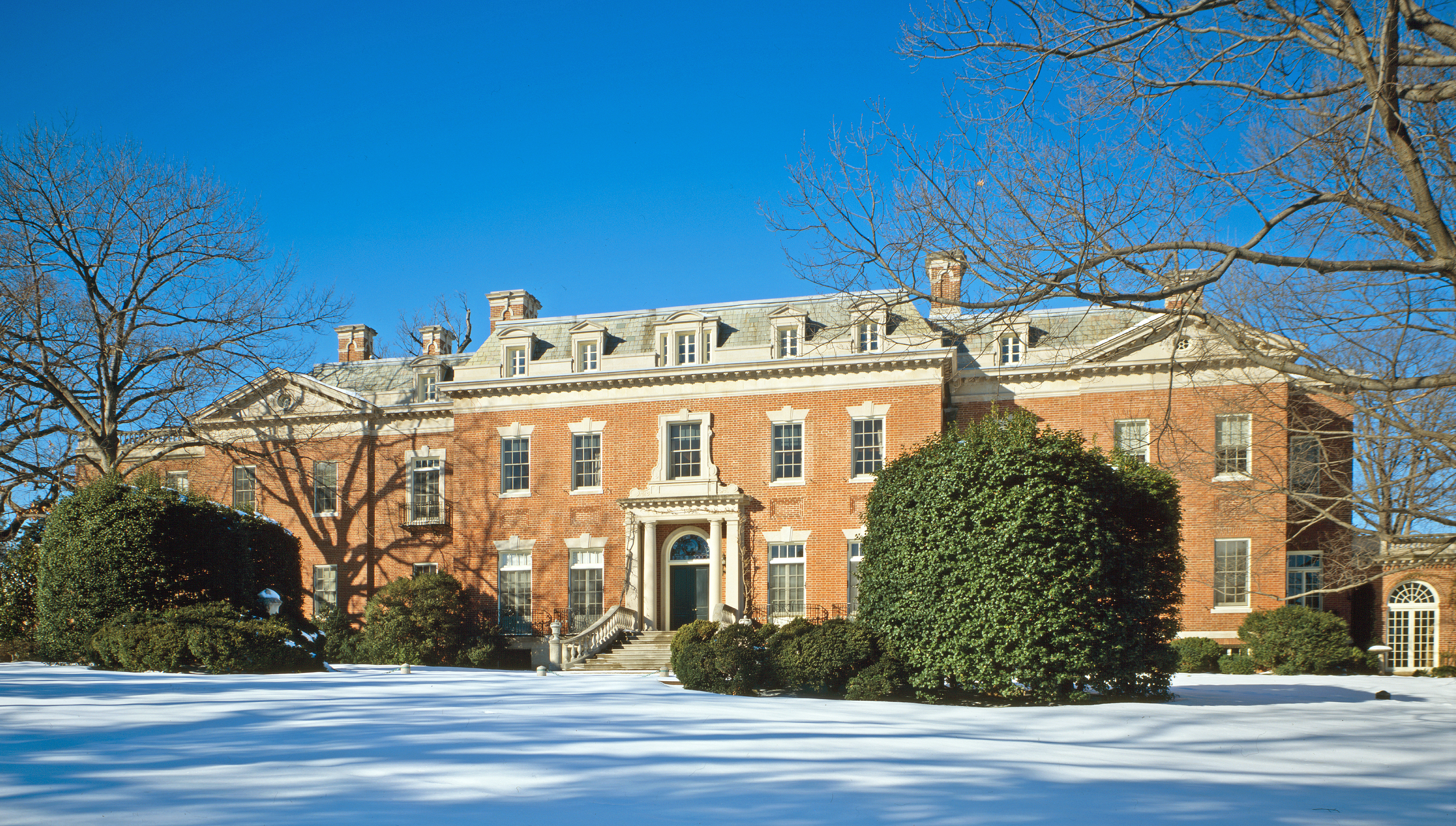
Dumbarton Oaks (1801)

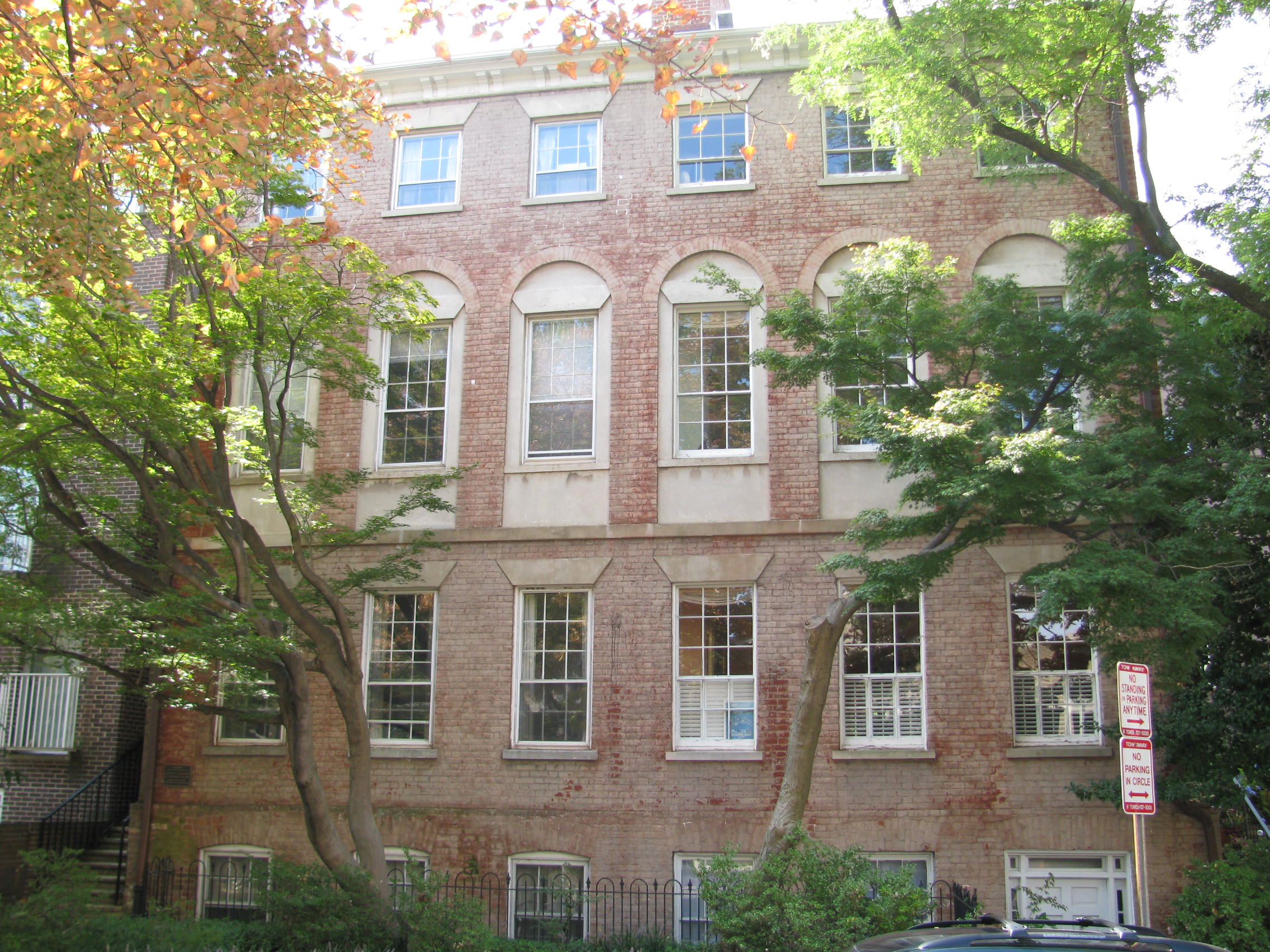
Duncanson-Cranch House (1794)

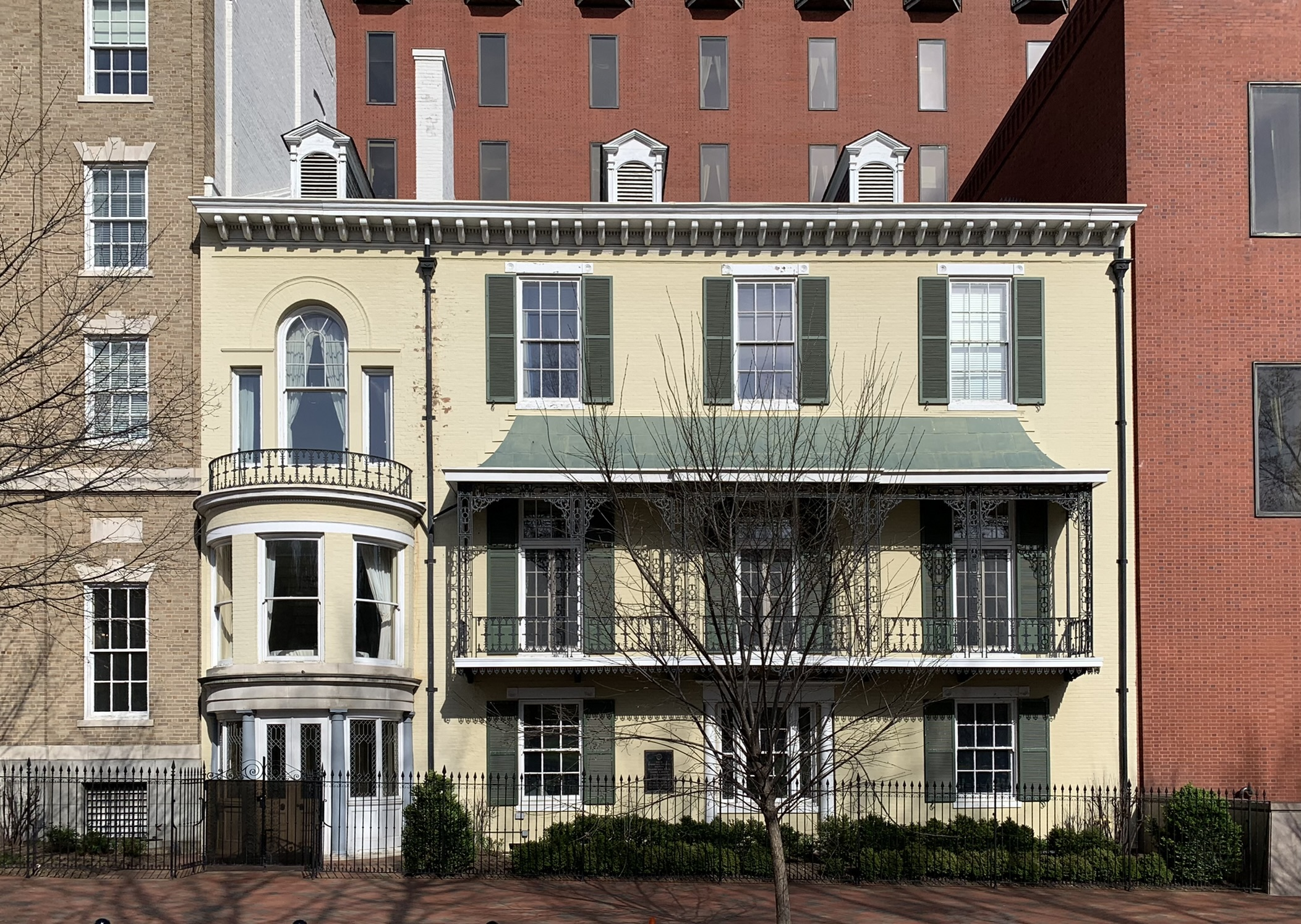
Benjamin Ogle Tayloe House (1828)

=== Victorian ===
Victorian residential architecture is present and recognizable in many of D.C.'s neighborhoods, most notably Capitol Hill, Columbia Heights, Dupont Circle, Shaw, LeDroit Park, and Adams Morgan. Built during the mid- to late-19th century, these structures are characterized as being tall, narrow, and often brightly painted rowhouses, with a turreted, spired, or conical roof and an English basement. The Queen Anne style, which is an architectural design within the wider Victorian style, is extremely common in these and other neighborhoods in the city. Common features of Queen Anne architecture include colorful and asymmetric façades, overhanging eaves, dentils, and oriel or bay windows.

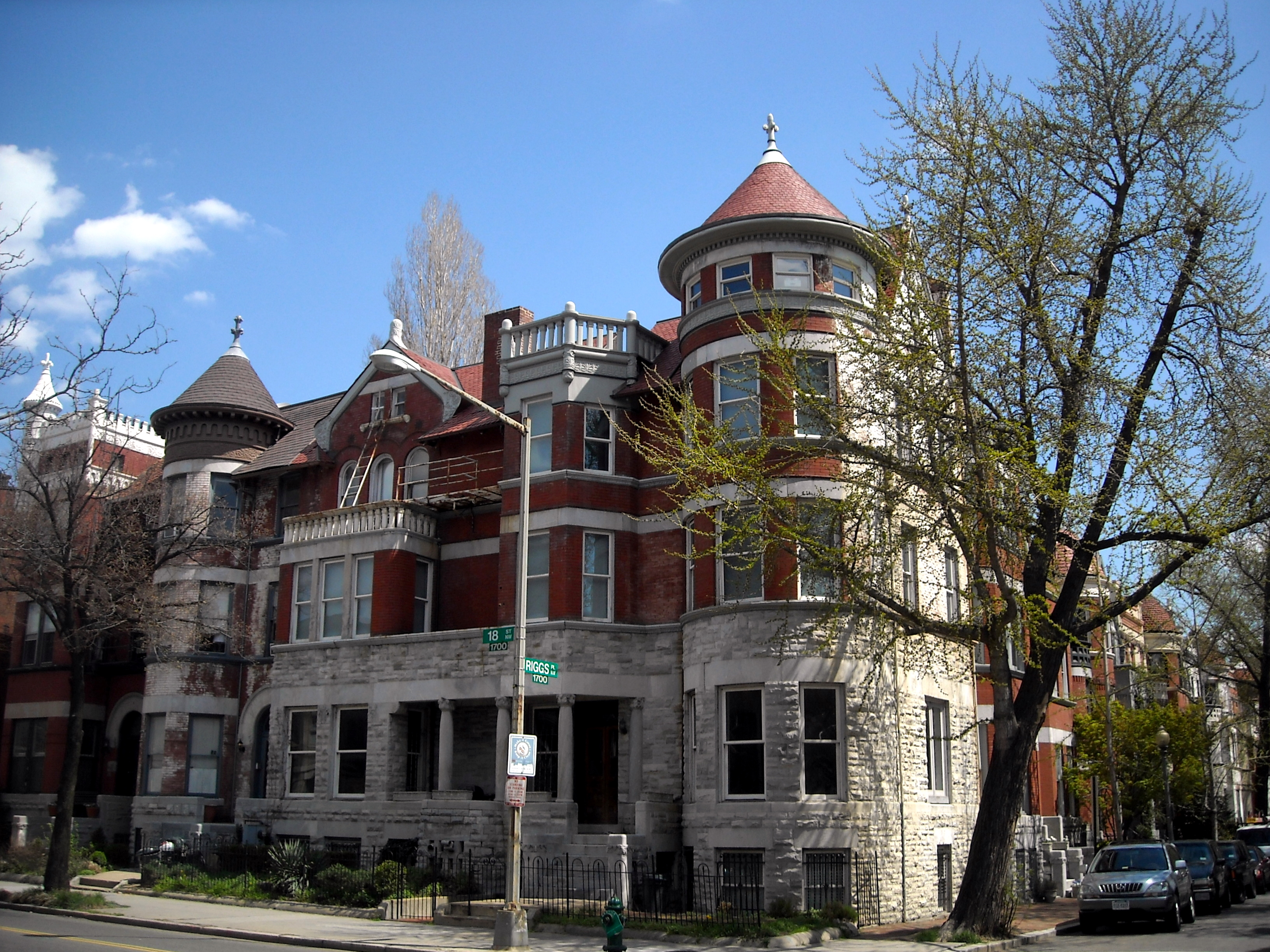
Victorian-style row houses on 18th Street NW near Dupont Circle.

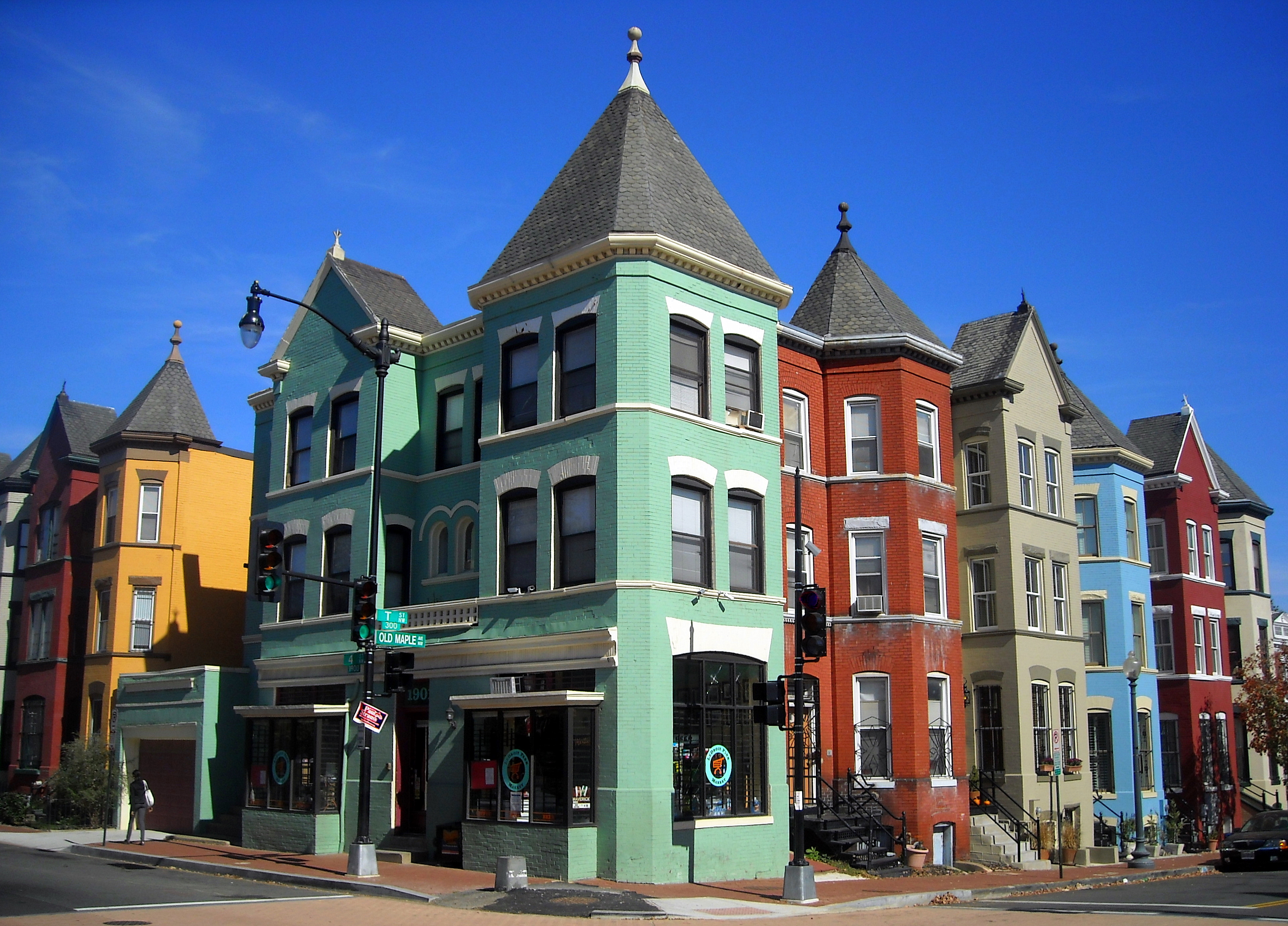
Row houses in LeDroit Park

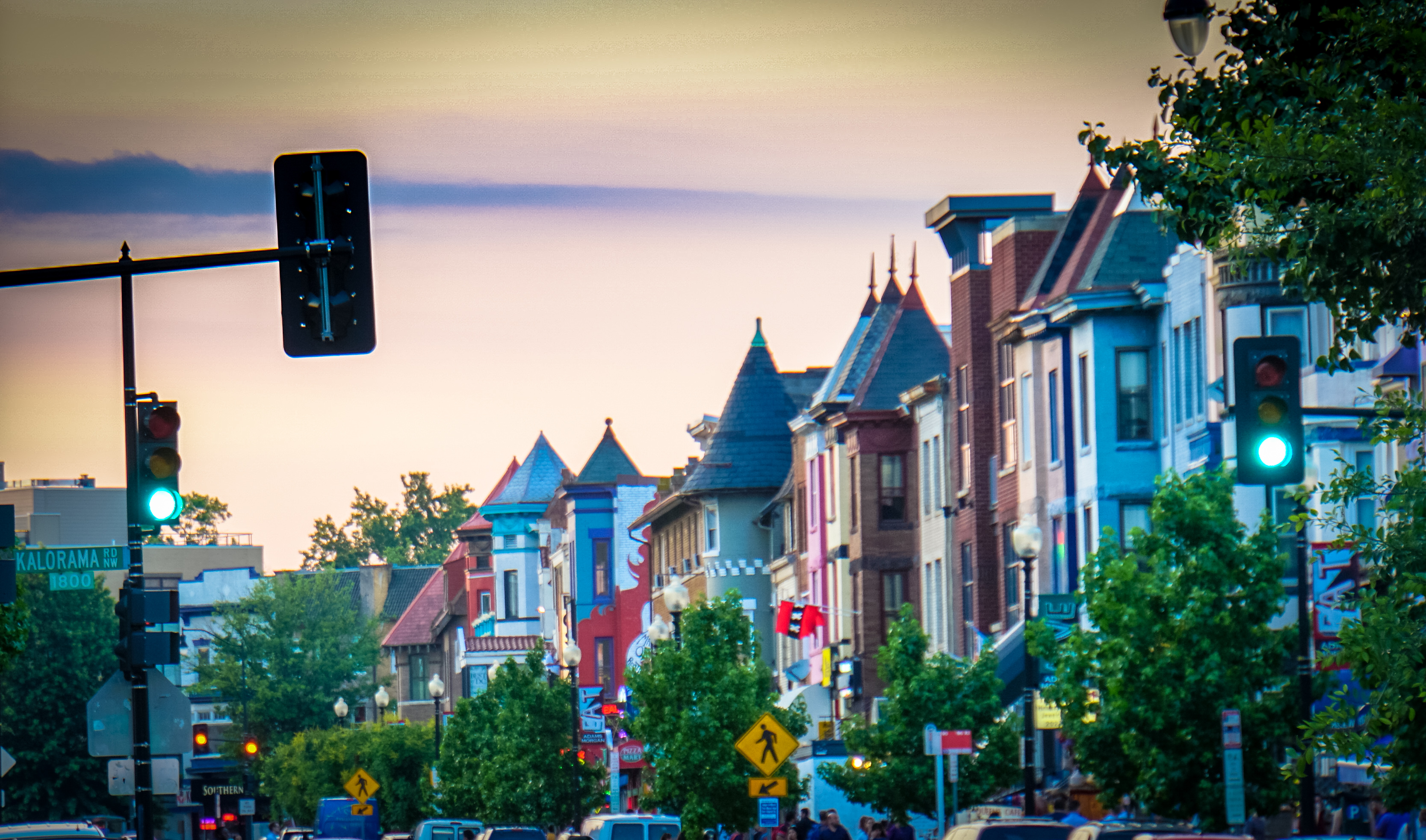
Row houses in Adams Morgan

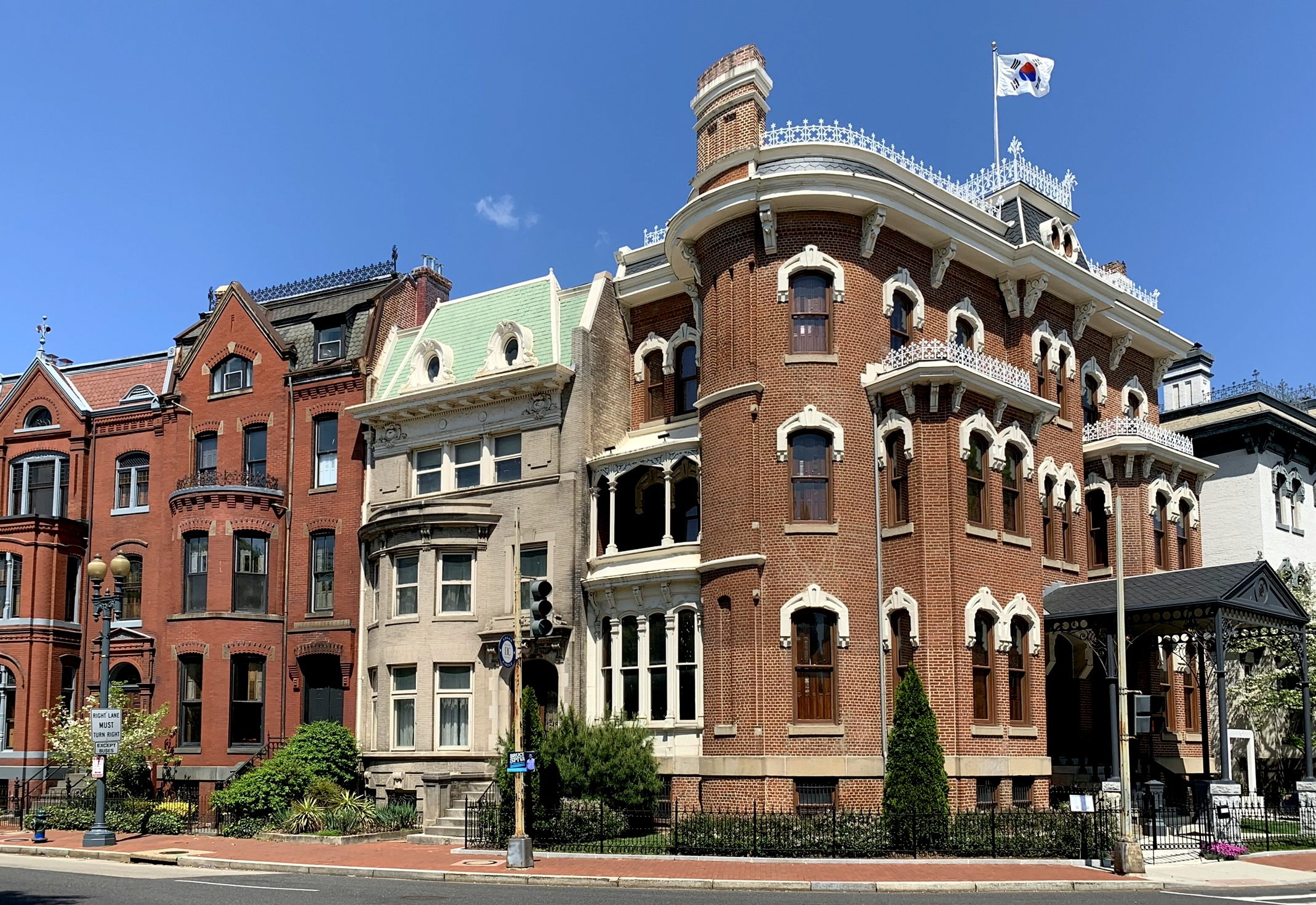
Victorian townhomes in Logan Circle

=== Tudor Revival ===
Tudor Revival architecture is an architectural style inspired by original Tudor architecture, which was popular during the Tudor period in Great Britain, between 1485 and 1603. Common attributes of this architectural style include timber framing, millioned windows, jettied floors, and sometimes thatched roofs.

This style of architecture is popular in some residential neighborhoods in Washington, most notably Georgetown, Foxhall Village, Kalorama, and Mount Pleasant.

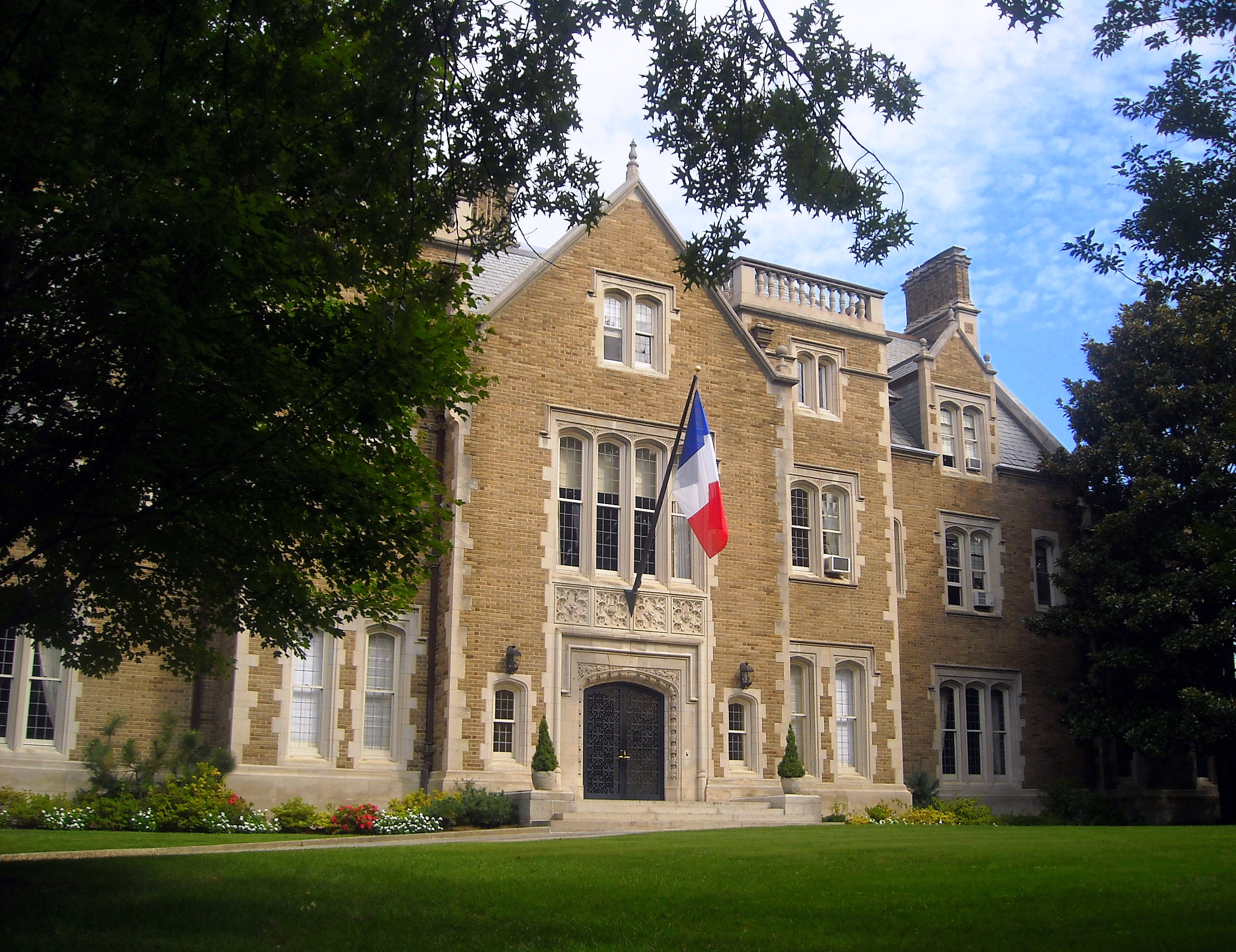
French ambassador's residence (1910)

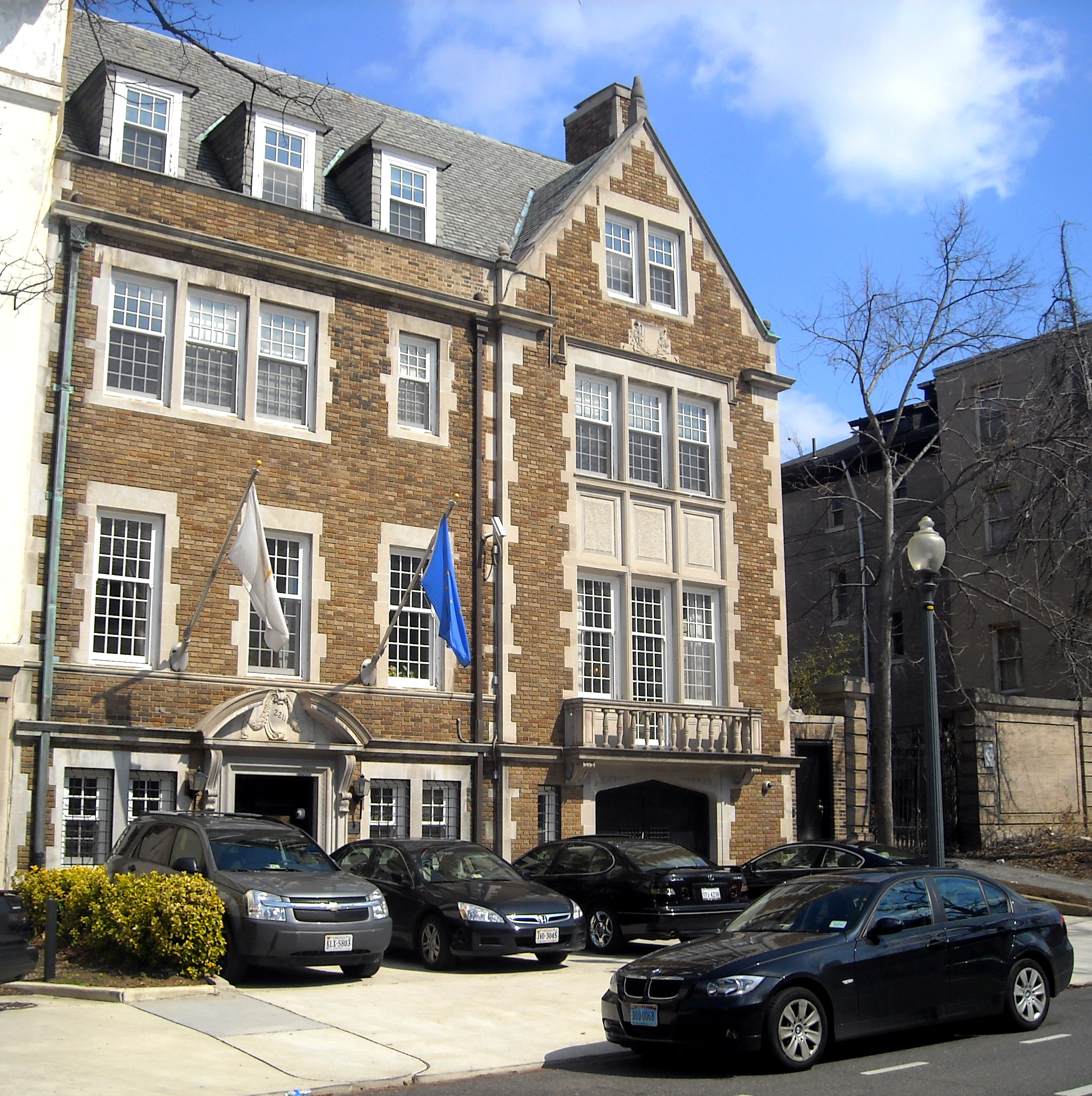
Embassy of Cyprus (1922)

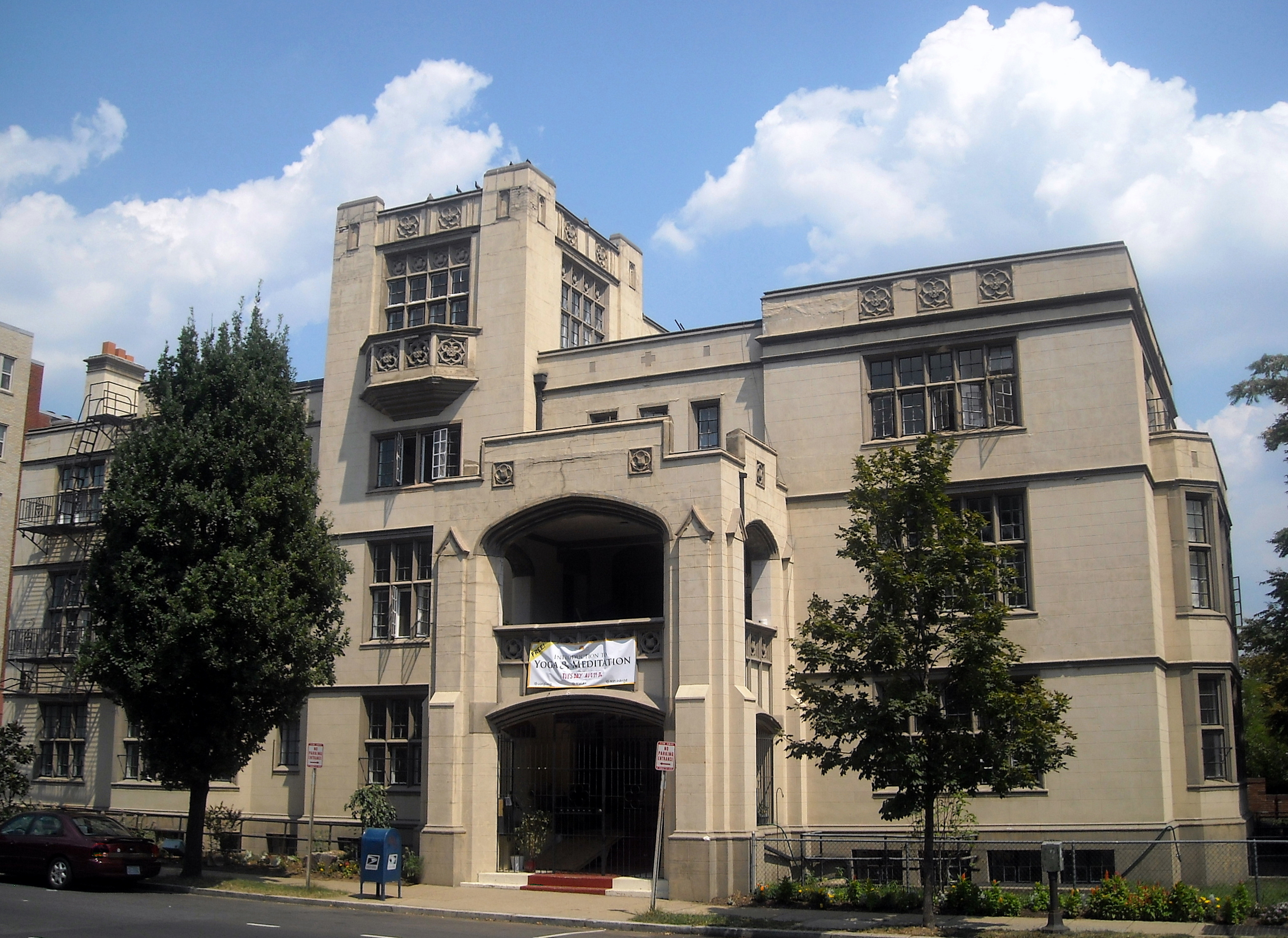
Meridian Hall (1923)

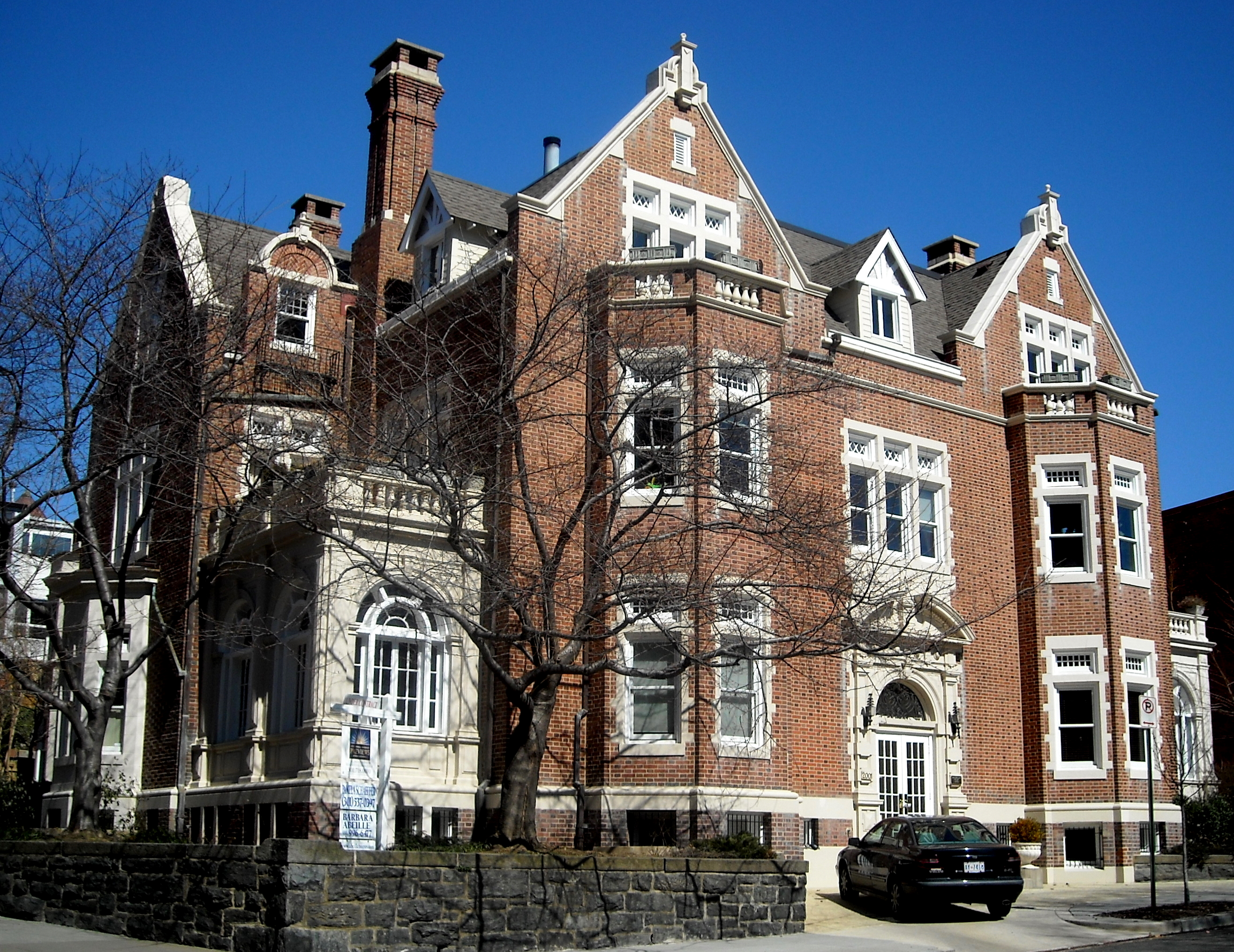
Former Embassy of China (1902)

=== Romanesque Revival ===
Romanesque Revival architecture, also called Neo-Romanesque, is an architectural style inspired by the 11th- and 12th-century Romanesque Architecture and uses castle-like designs, such as battlements, heavy usage of masonry (such as stone or brick), and pronounced arches and towers.

Romanesque revival was a popular architectural style for the city's buildings built in the mid- to late-19th century. Many of the city's Romanesque Revival buildings are made of sandstone. Examples of apartment buildings in this style are The Cairo Apartment Building in Dupont Circle, the Luzon Apartment Building in the West End, the Gladstone and Hawarden Apartment Buildings in Logan Circle, and the Jefferson Apartment Building in Mount Vernon Triangle. The Old Post Office Building, constructed in 1899 and located Downtown, is also built in this style and was the first building in the city to be constructed with a steel frame structure. Churches in D.C. that are built in the Romanesque Revival style include the Franciscan Monastery of the Holy Land in America in Brookland, the Basilica of the National Shrine of the Immaculate Conception in University Heights, and St. Aloysius Church in Near Northeast. Additionally, the Charles Sumner School near the Golden Triangle and the Arts and Industries Building on the National Mall are in this style. The Smithsonian Institution Building, also known as "the castle", is located on the National Mall and incorporates elements of both Romanesque Revival and Gothic Revival styles into its architecture.

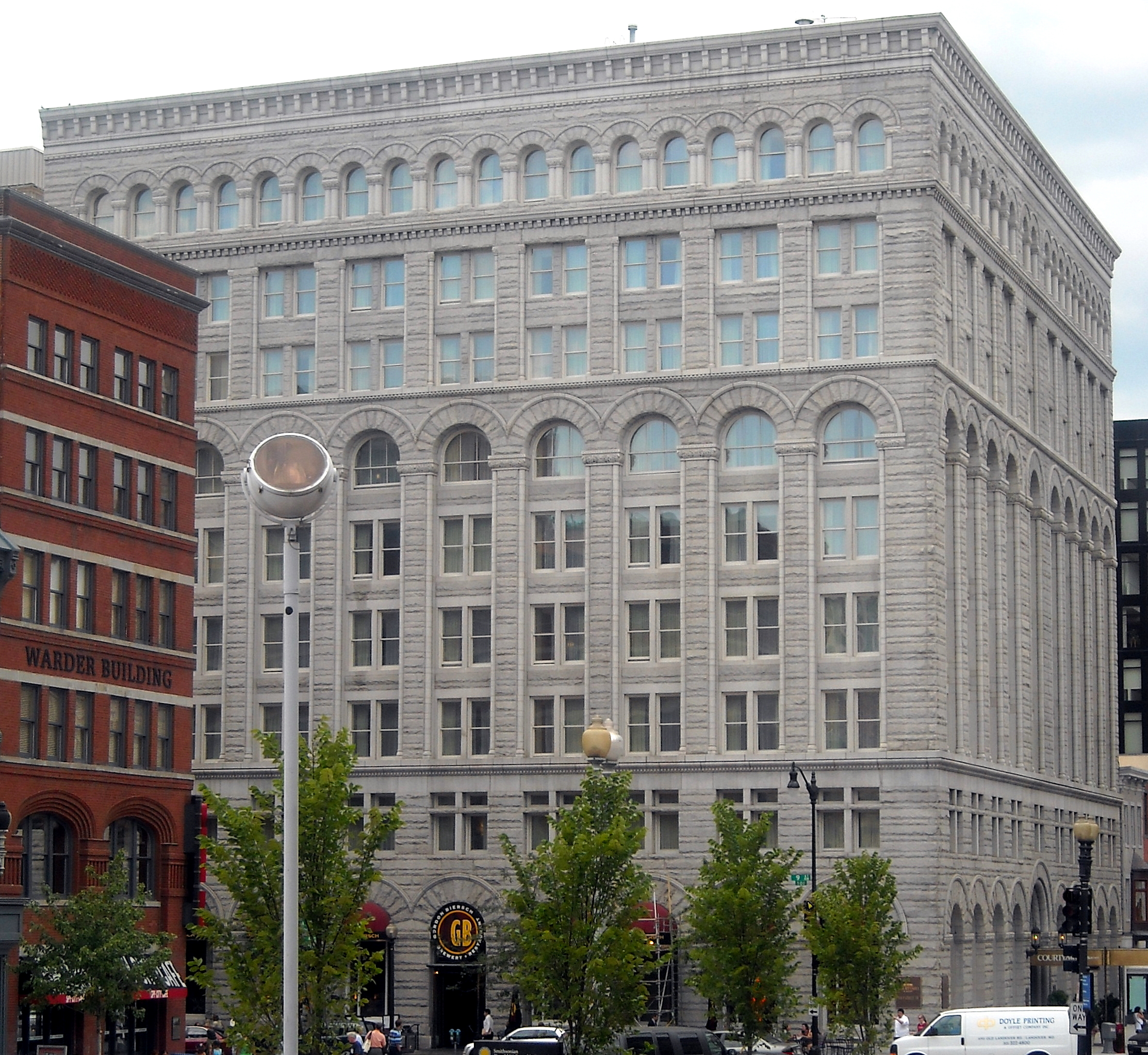
Riggs Hotel (1891)

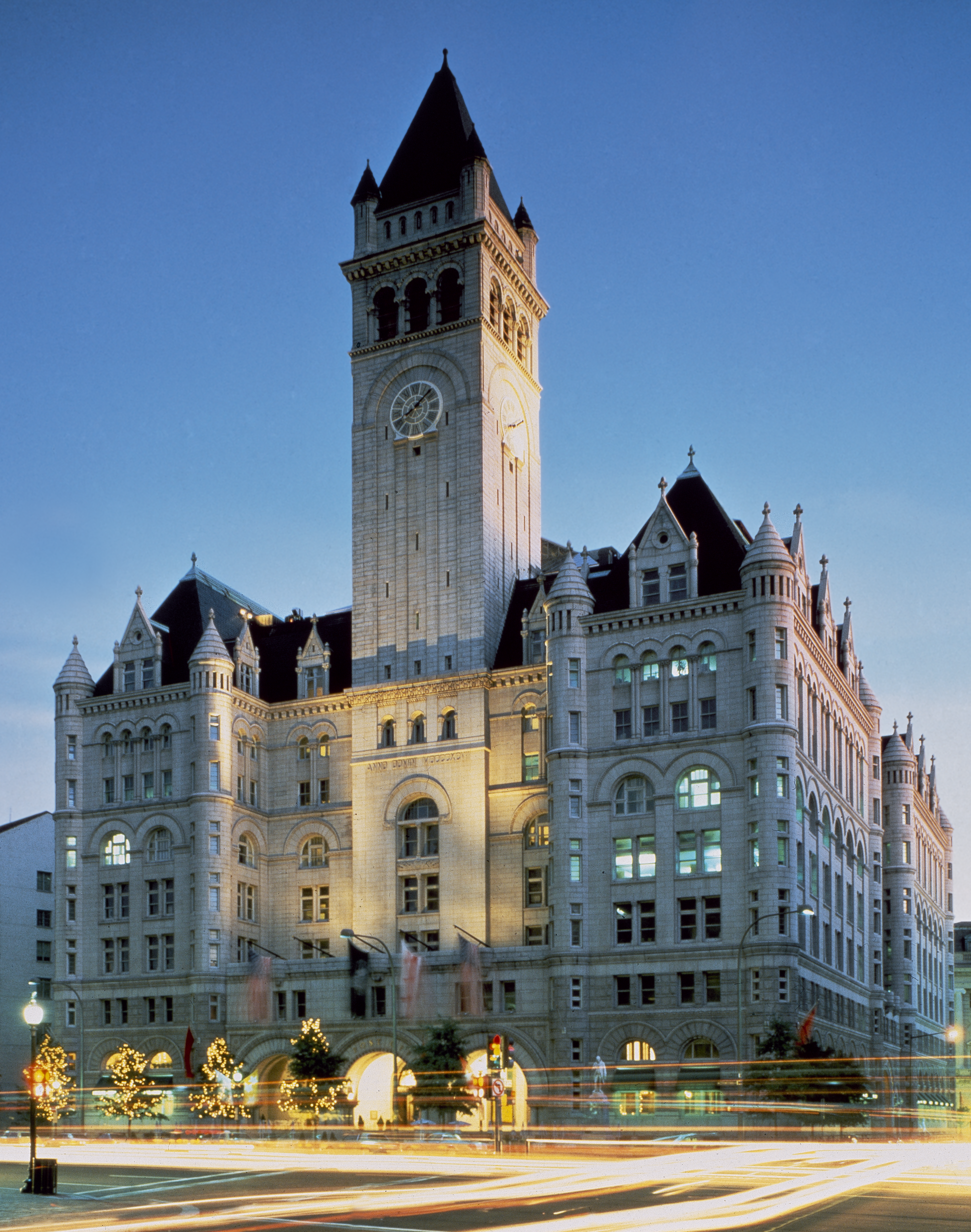
Old Post Office (1899)

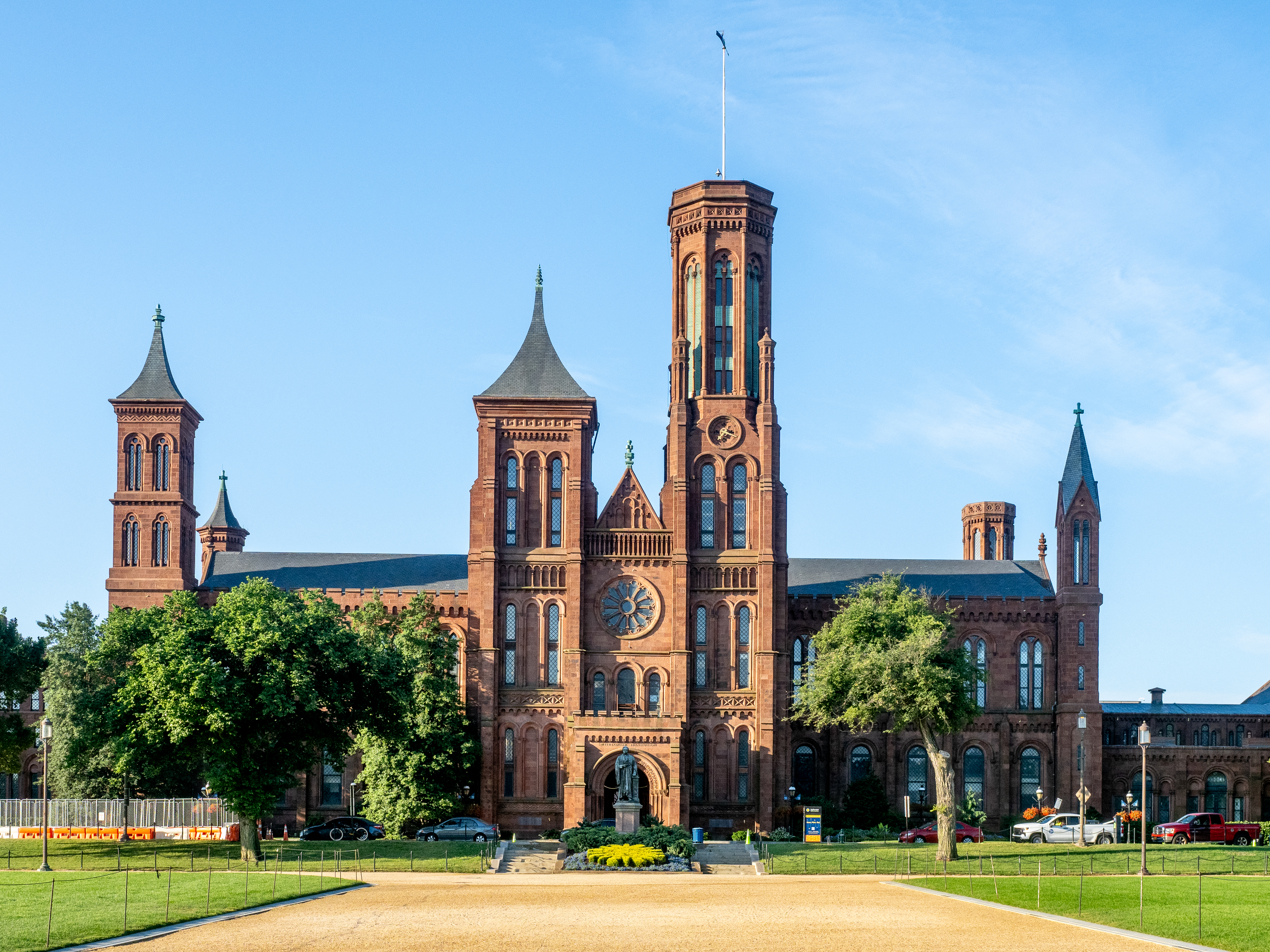
Smithsonian Castle (1855)

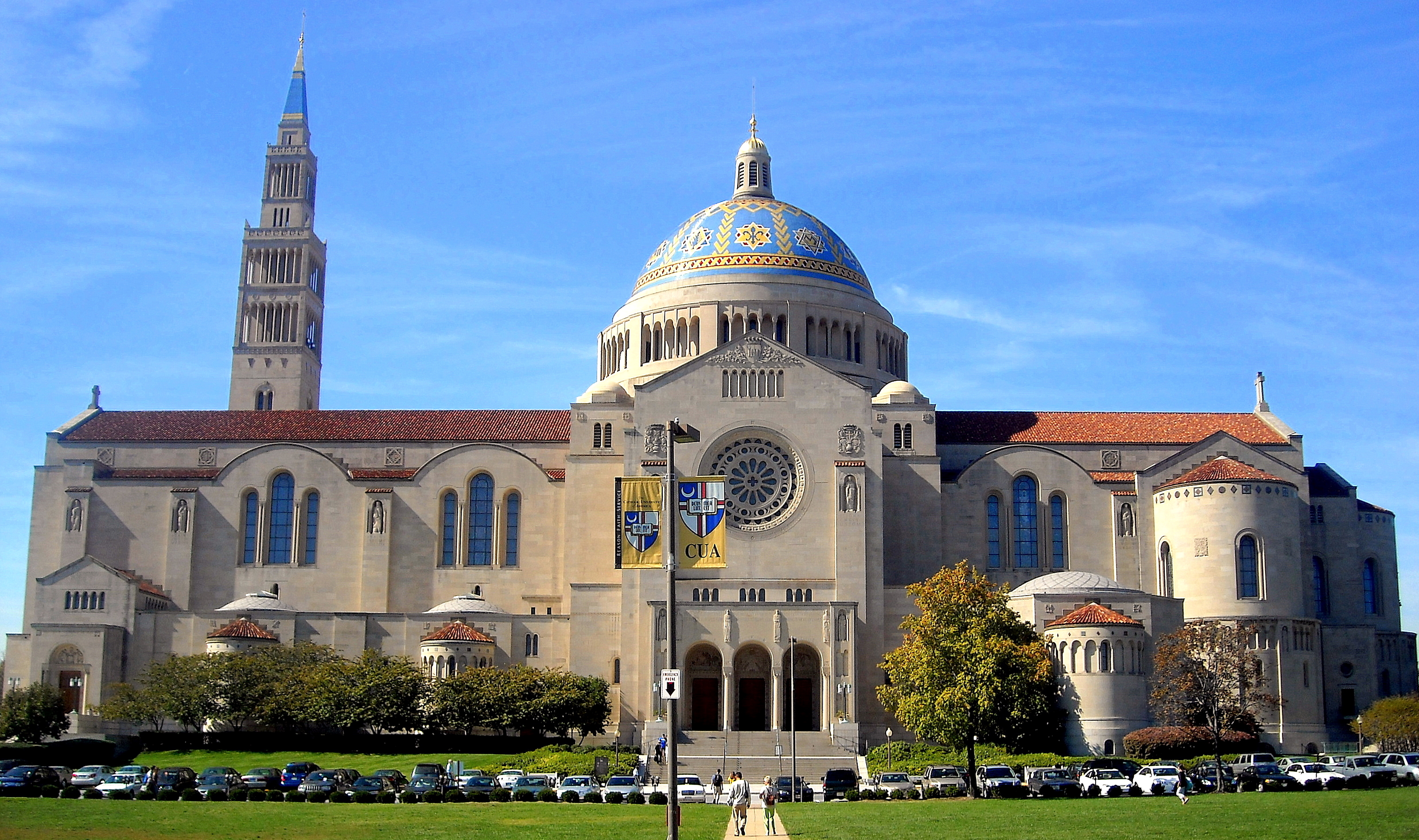
Basilica of the National Shrine of the Immaculate Conception (1920–2017)

=== Gothic Revival ===
Gothic Revival architecture, also called Neo-Gothic, is an architectural style that revives traditional Gothic architecture but with the benefit of modern technology and tastes. As is the case with traditional Gothic architecture, buildings constructed in the Gothic Revival motif are often churches, cathedrals, and buildings used to house a large congregation of people. These structures often include tall bell towers and spires, and are made of stone. Other elements of this architecture include heavy decorative patterns, gargoyles, flying buttresses, finials, lancet windows, and hood molds.

Many of the most prominent Gothic revival buildings in Washington, D.C. are churches and cathedrals built from the end of the 19th century through the middle of the 20th century. Notable Neo-Gothic buildings include the Washington National Cathedral in Cathedral Heights, Immaculate Conception Church near Mount Vernon Square, the National Presbyterian Church in Cathedral Heights, St. Elizabeths Hospital near Congress Heights, Alban Towers on Embassy Row, and the Castle Gatehouse of the Washington Aqueduct near Foxhall Village.

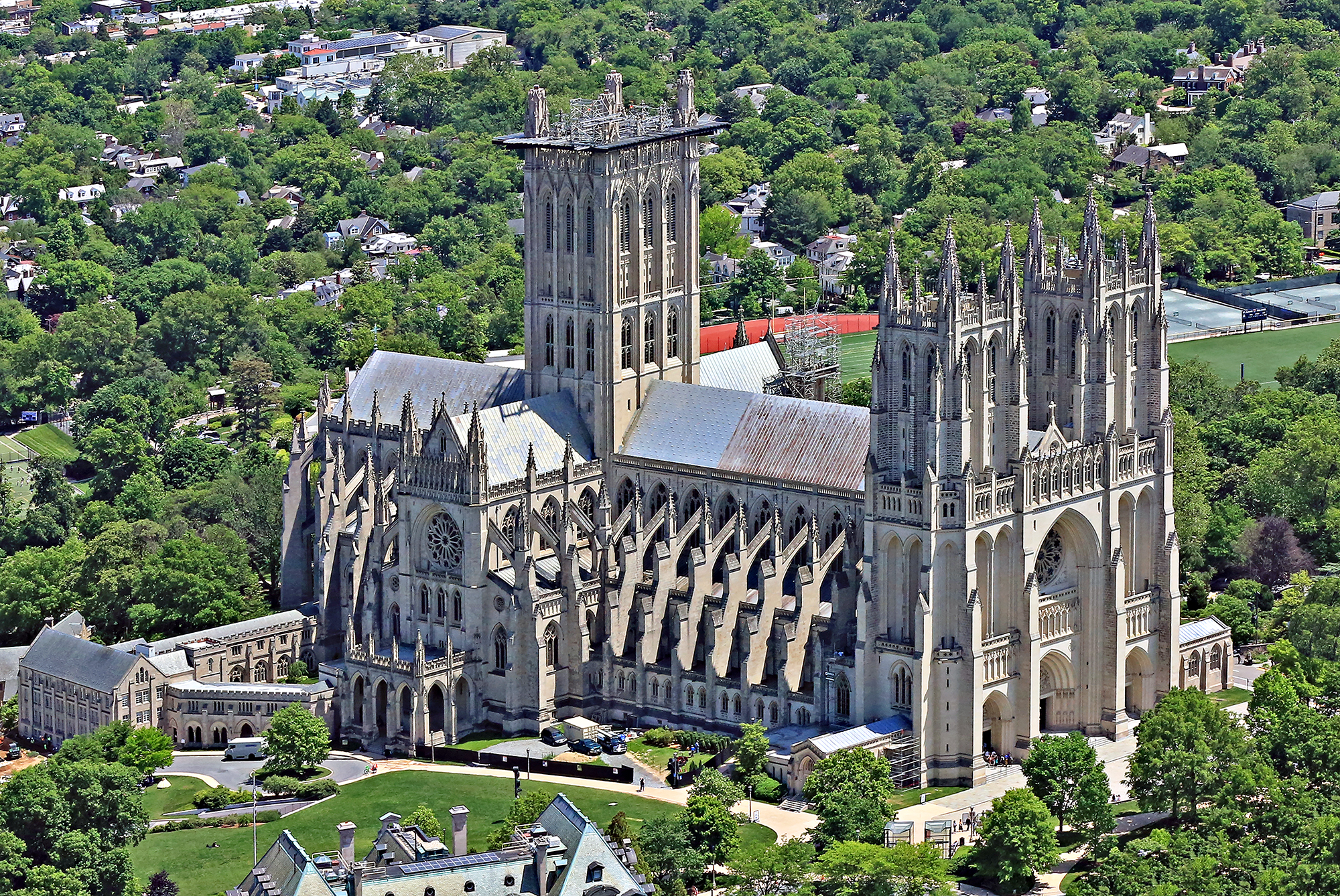
Washington National Cathedral (1906–1988)

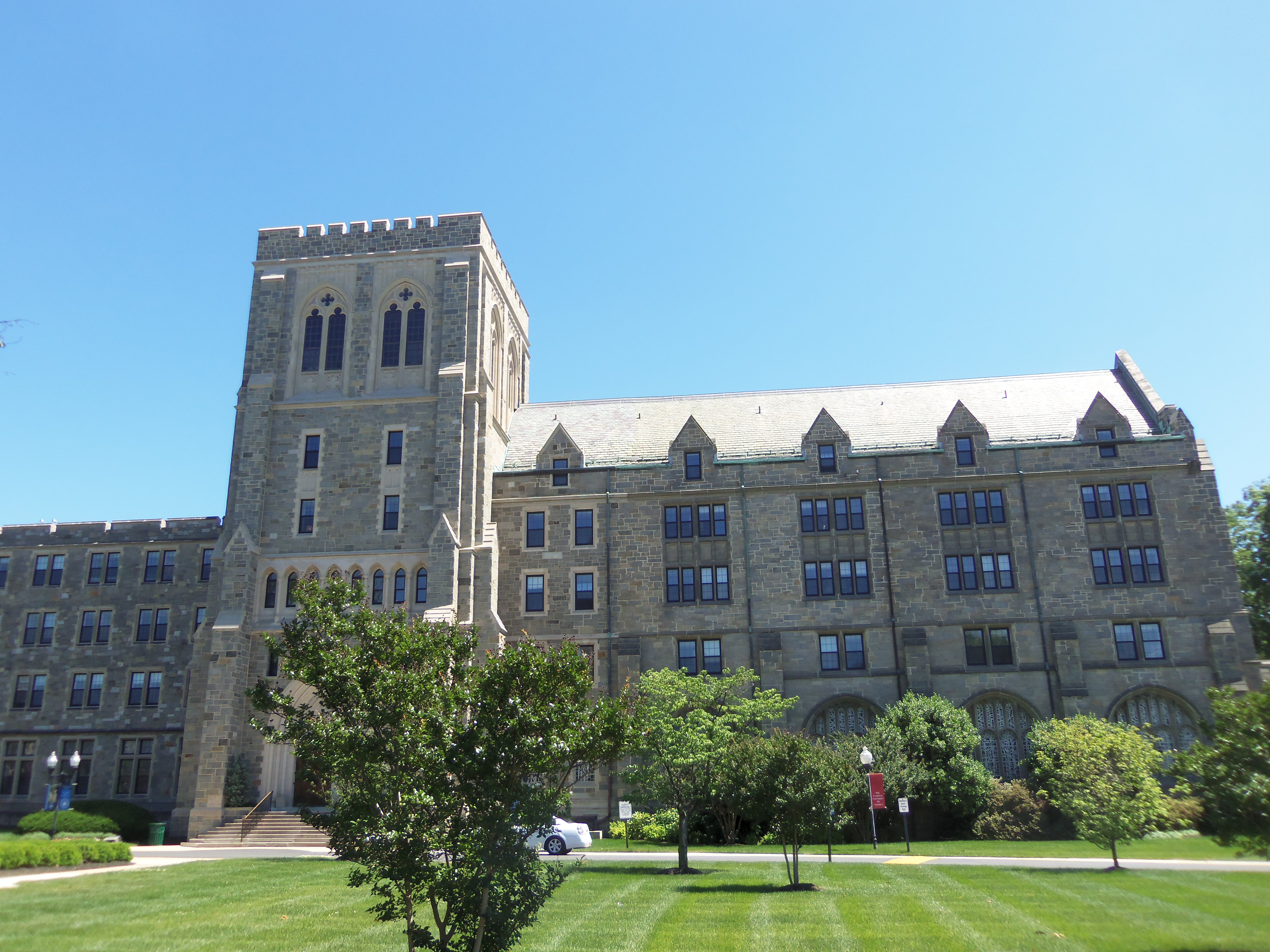
Theological College (1917)

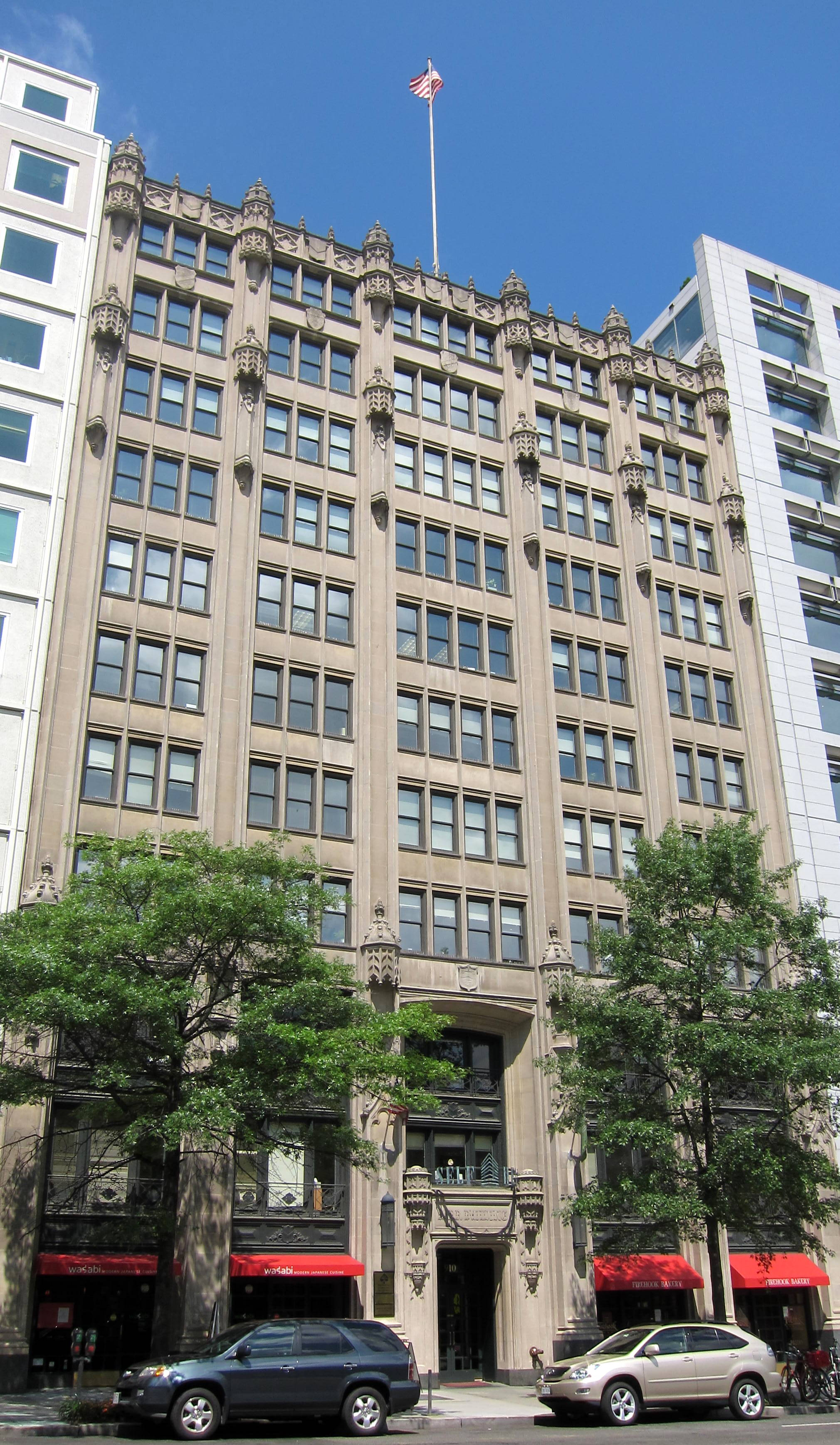
Barr Building (1927)

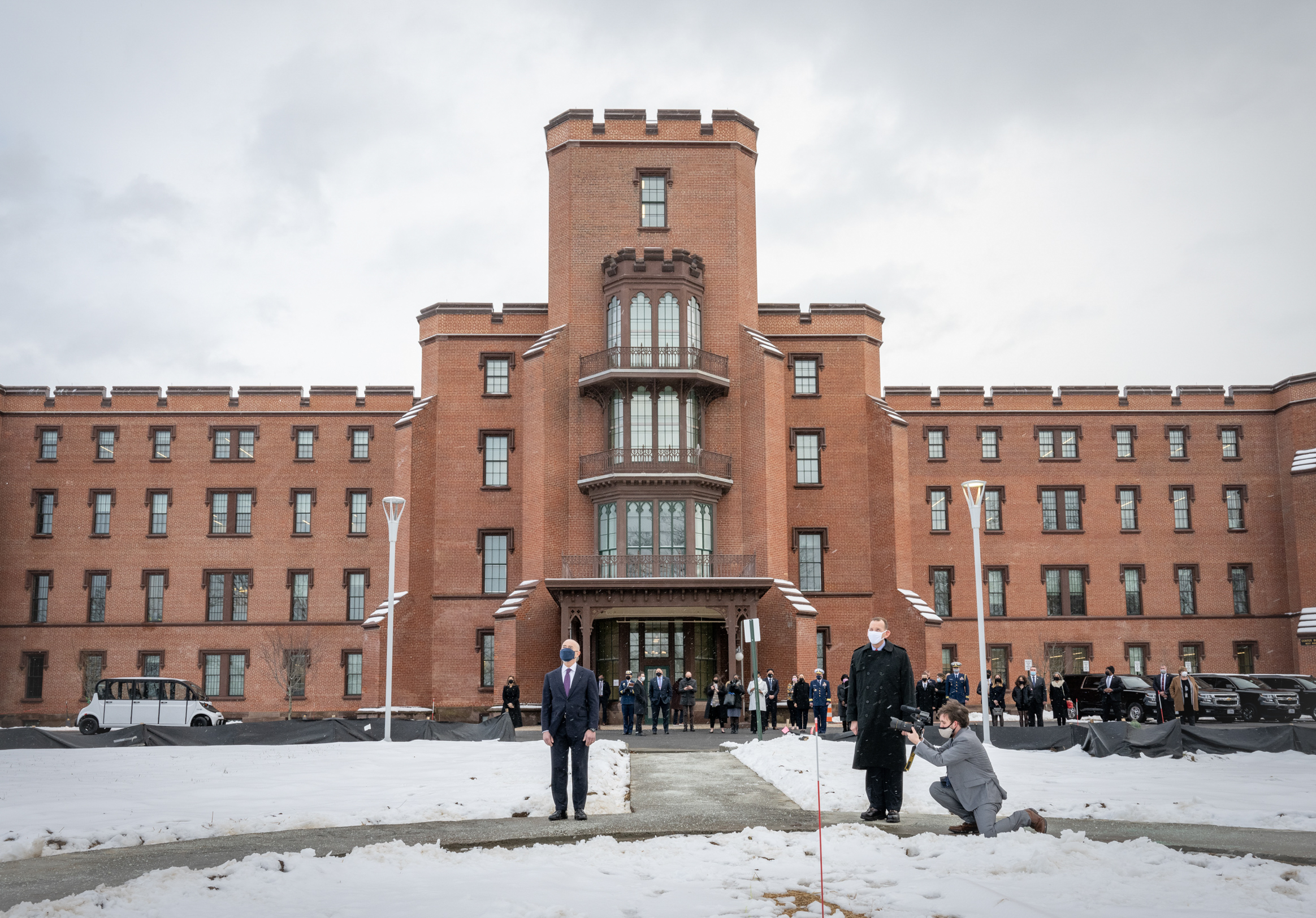
Department of Homeland Security (1855)

=== Beaux-Arts ===
Popularized in Europe in the 19th century, Beaux-Arts architecture arrived in the U.S. in the latter decades of the 19th century and continued into the 20th century in many of the country's larger east coast cities. This architectural school is defined by the ornate elements of bold, overscaled details both on the exterior and interior of buildings. Characteristics of Beaux-Arts architecture include a rusticated first floor, arched windows, and classical details, such as balustrades, pilasters, and festoons.

This style is common for hotels and some government buildings built in the city between the 1880s and 1930s. Some examples of Beaux-Arts buildings in D.C. are the Embassy of Uzbekistan on Embassy Row, the Wyoming Apartments in Kalorama, the Carnegie Library of Washington D.C. in Mount Vernon Square, the Main Interior Building in Foggy Bottom, the Thomas Jefferson Building of the Library of Congress on Capitol Hill, the Bond Building located Downtown, the Andrew Mellon Building on Embassy Row, and the Willard Hotel located Downtown.

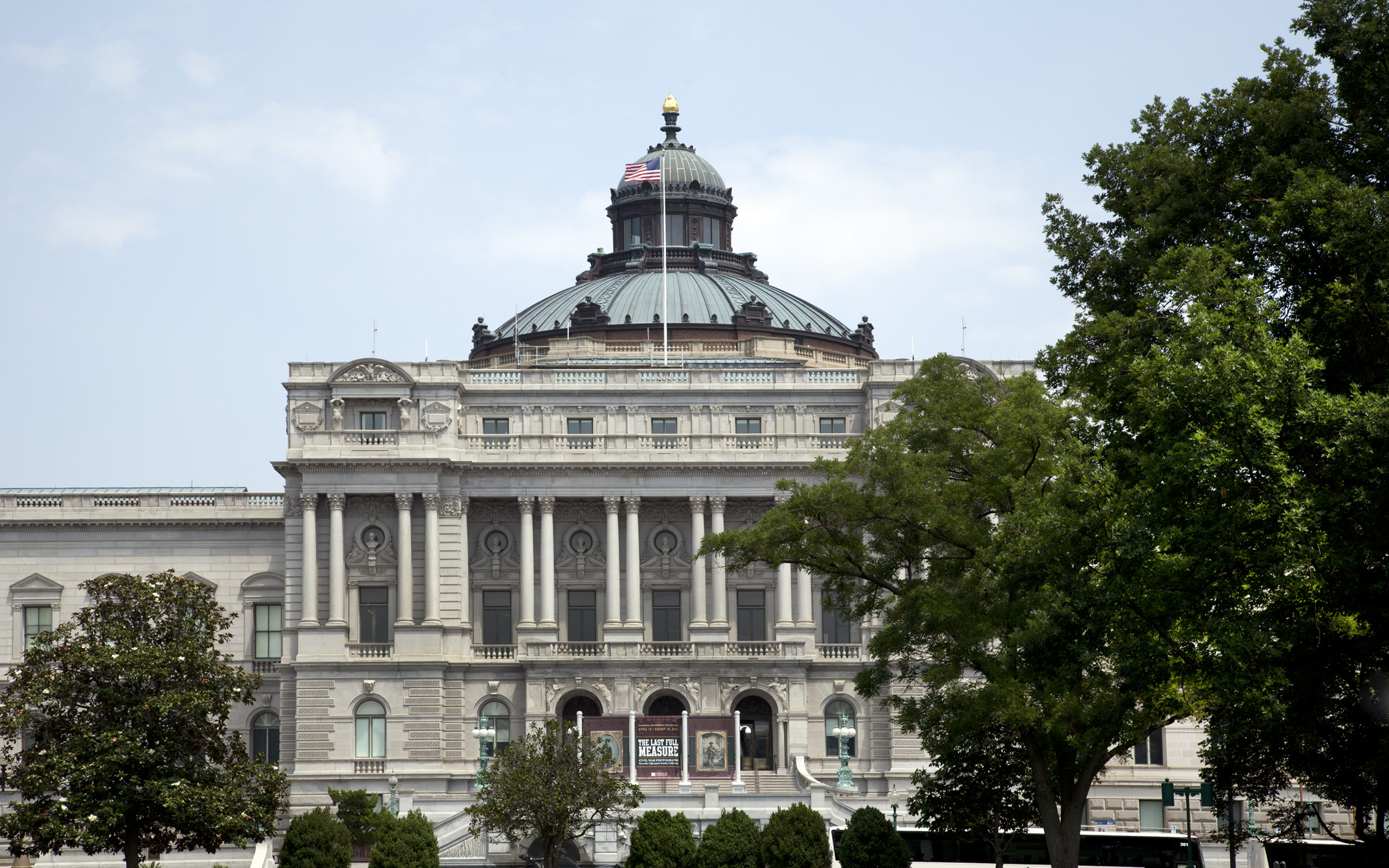
Thomas Jefferson Building of the Library of Congress (1897)

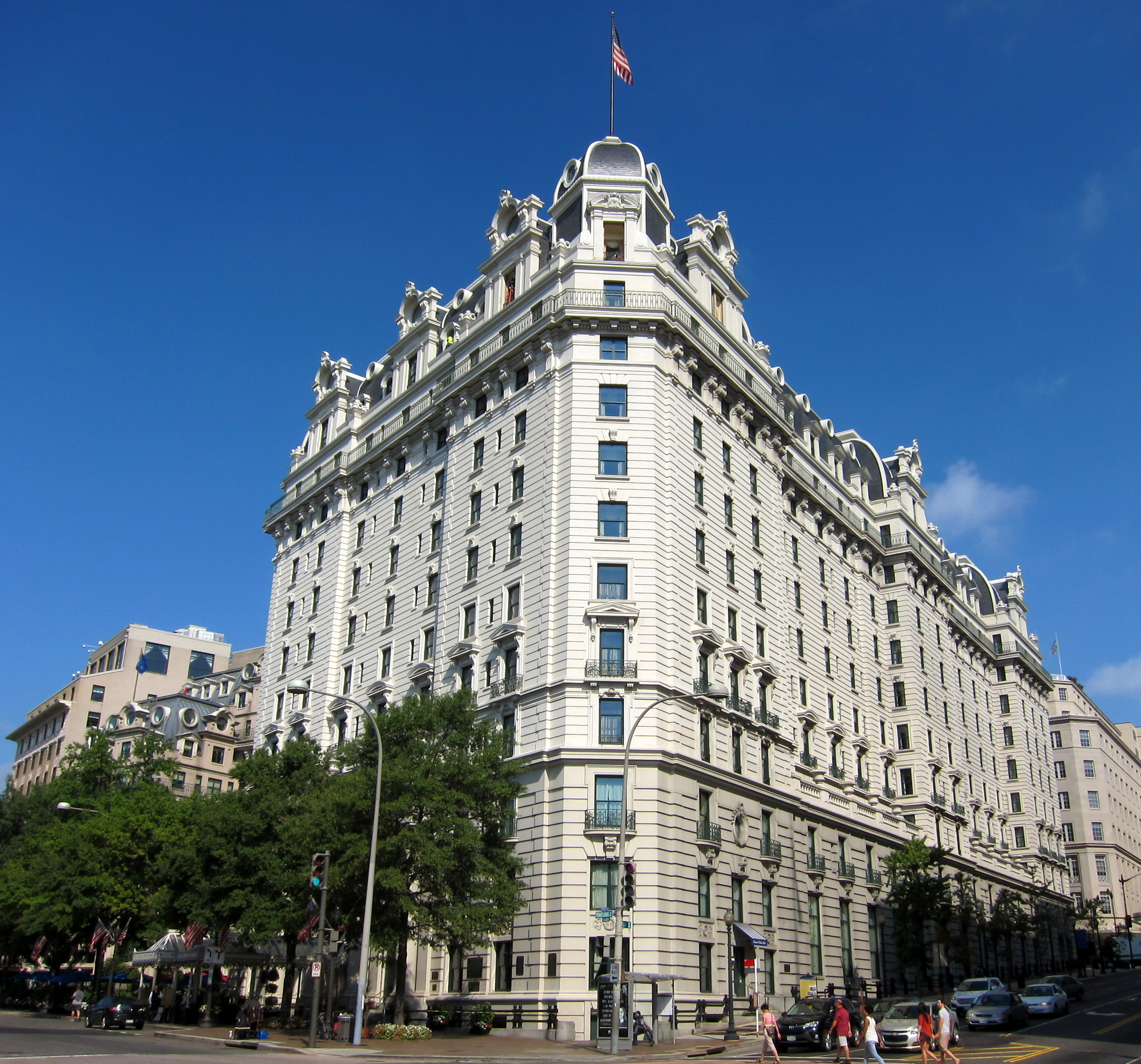
Willard Hotel (1901)

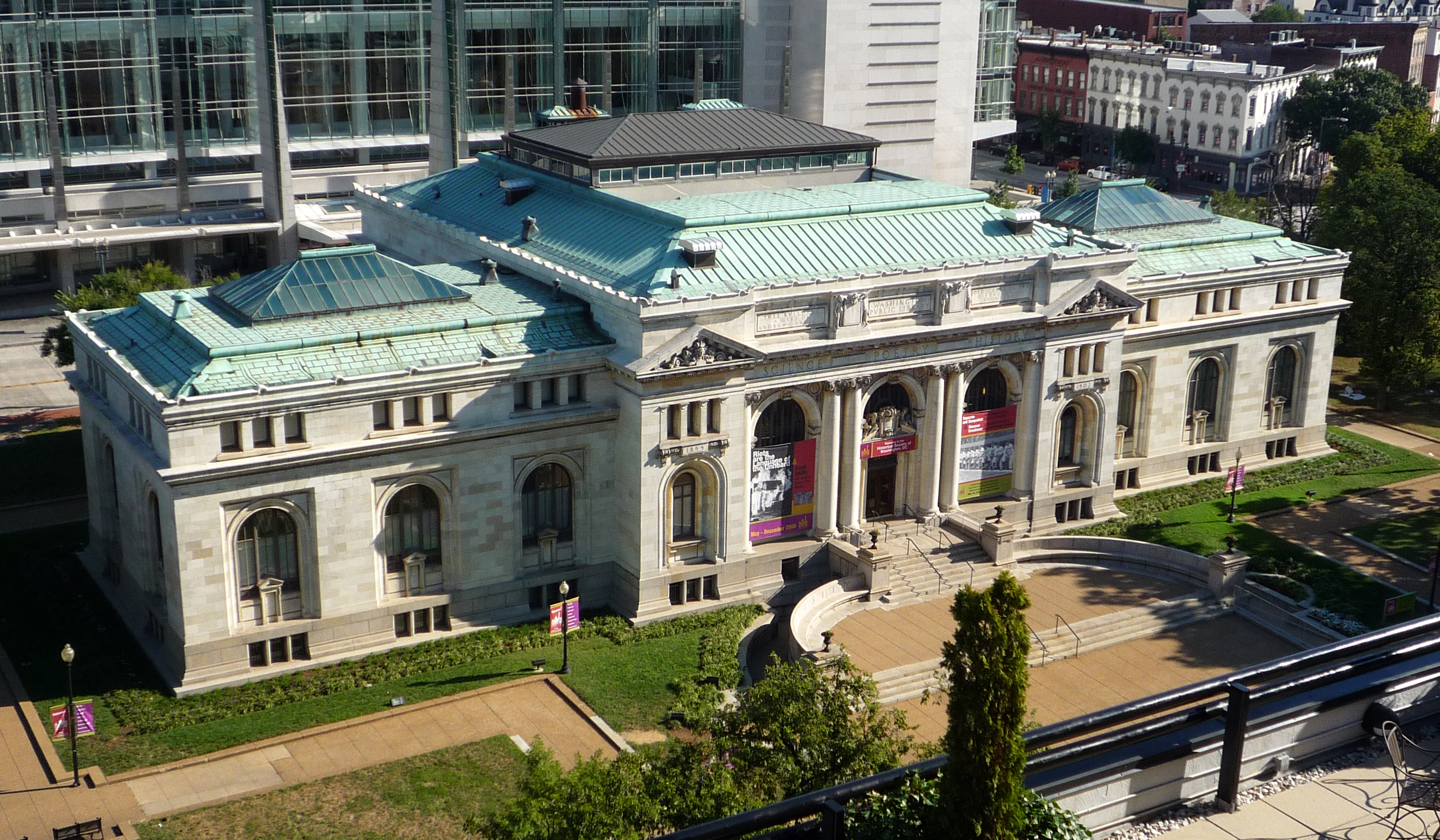
Carnegie Library of Washington D.C. (1903)

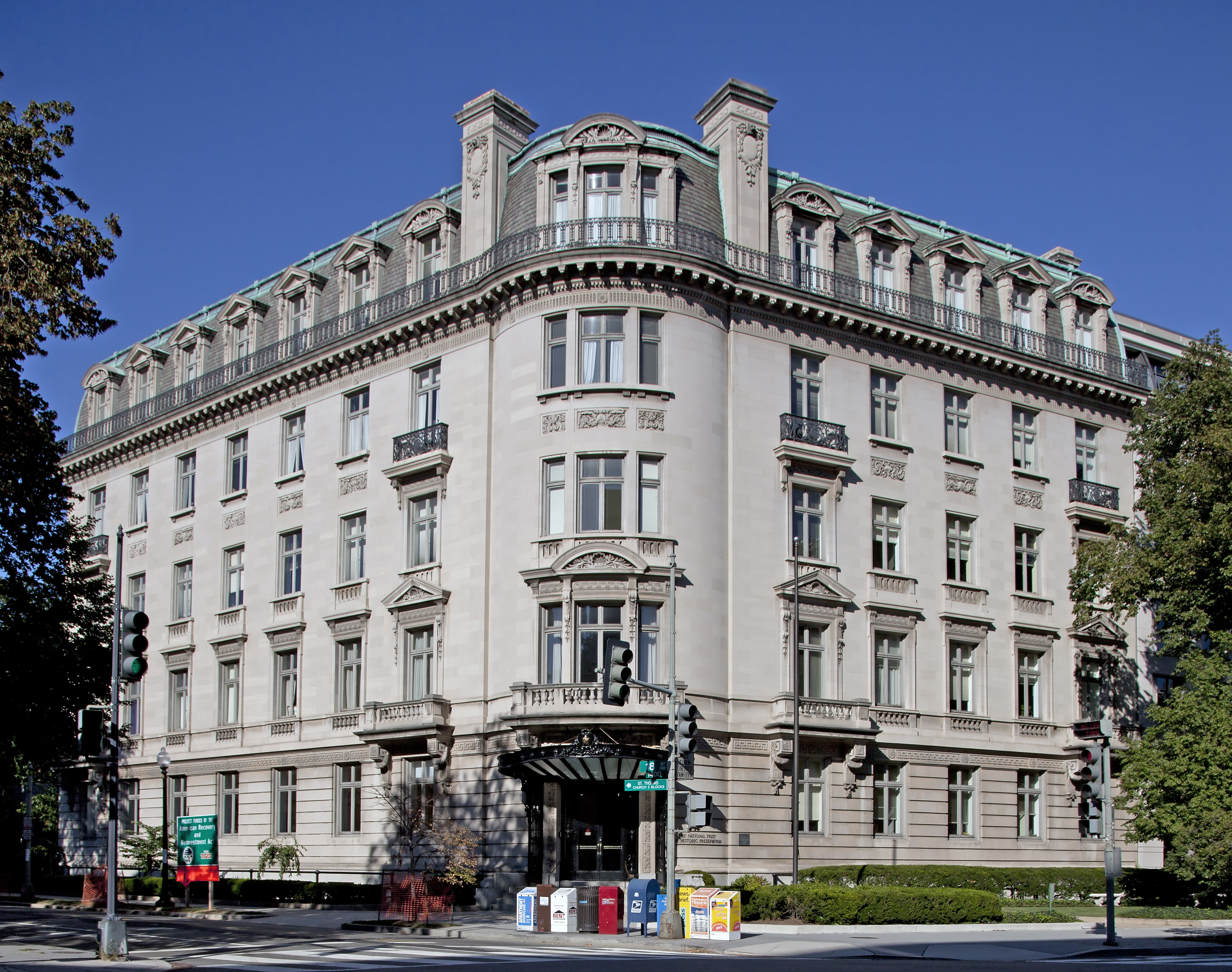
Andrew Mellon Building (1915)

=== Brutalism ===
Brutalist architecture was popularized in the mid-20th century and is defined by stripped-down minimalist designs that depict the bare building materials and structural elements of buildings, in contrast with the more decorative elements found in preceding architectural styles. Brutalism often uses symmetry and abstract shapes to depict general ideas while playing with light and shadow. Many brutalist structures are made of unpainted concrete or brick, with angled geometric shapes.

Brutalism is present throughout Washington, D.C., but is especially visible in the city's central neighborhoods, most notably Downtown, the National Mall, and Southwest Washington. Due to the fact that Brutalism's height in popularity intersected with a major construction boom as Washington was becoming one of the world's most important cities during the third quarter of the 1900s, many of the city's prominent museums, government buildings, and office buildings built between the 1950s and 1980s were built in the Brutalist style.

Examples of such buildings are the Hirshhorn Museum on the National Mall, the James V. Forrestal Building in Southwest D.C., the Washington Hilton near Kalorama, the Robert C. Weaver Federal Building in Southwest D.C., and the J. Edgar Hoover Building located Downtown. Additionally, the interior ceilings of the Washington Metro are built with a brutalist design, characterized by low lighting, symmetry, and abstract rectangular shapes made of concrete slabs.

Robert C. Weaver Federal Building, headquarters of the Department of Housing and Urban Development (1965)

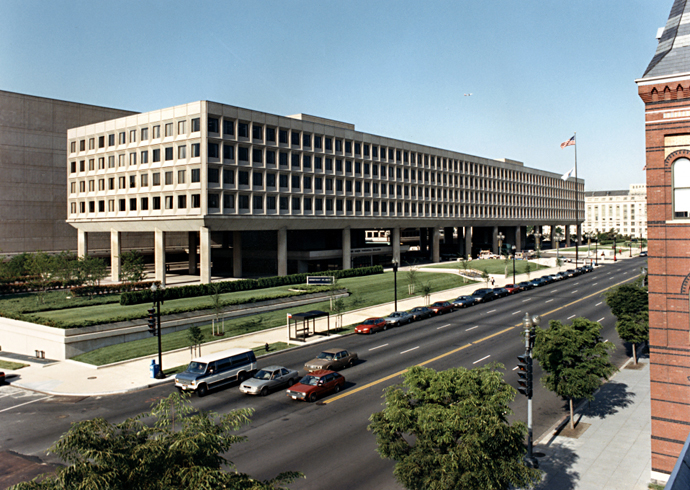
James V. Forrestal Building, headquarters of the U.S. Department of Energy (1969)

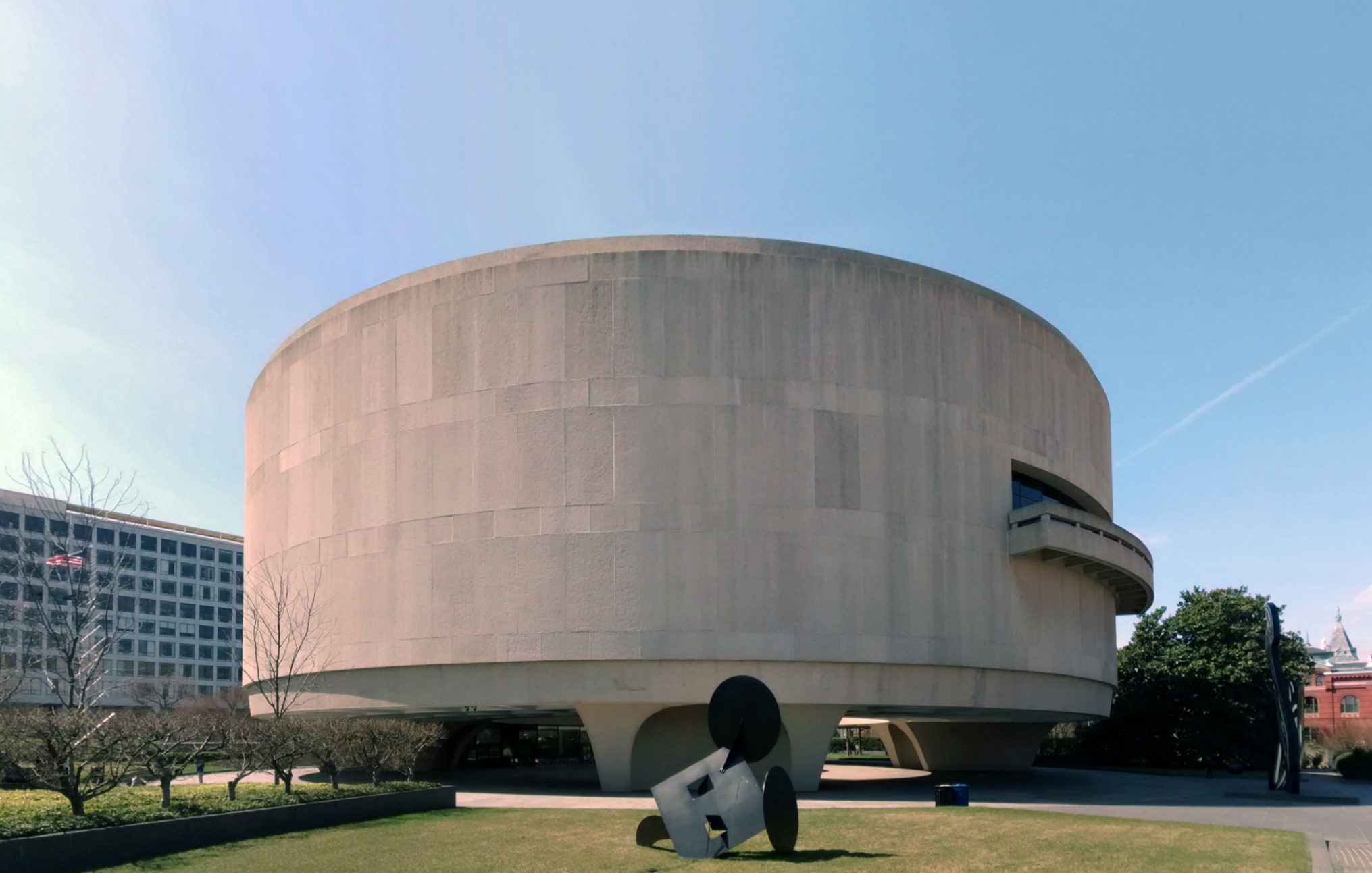
Hirshhorn Museum (1974)

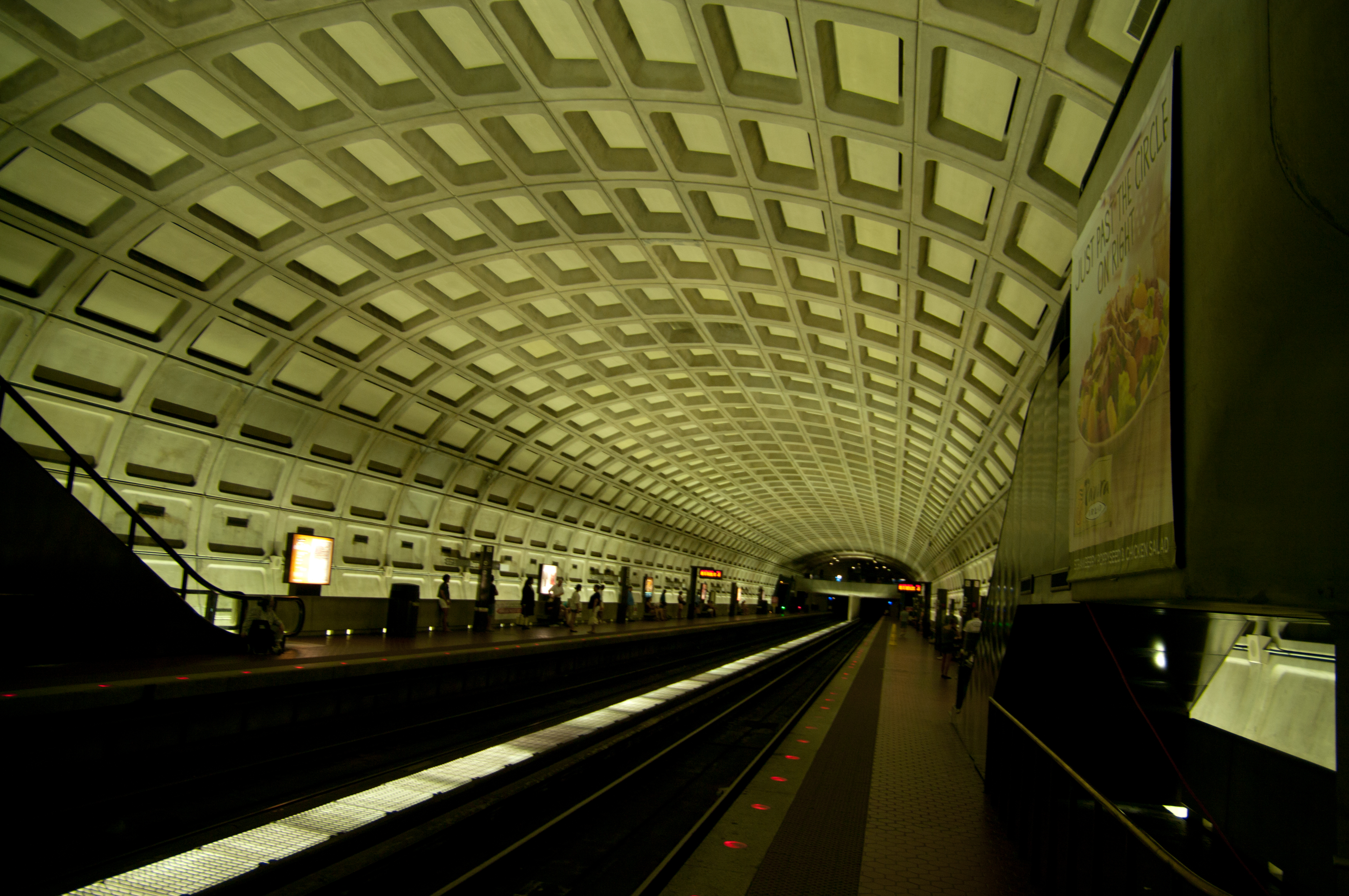
Interior ceiling of the Washington Metro (1976)

=== Modernism ===
Modernist architecture is a style that, similar to Brutalism, embraces minimalism and rejects the decorative elements of more traditional architectural movements. Unlike Brutalism, however, this movement emphasizes the use of glass and metal to create iconic shapes and lead the viewers eye around the structure. This school leans on the notion that form follows function.

Among the most famous buildings in Washington built under the Modernist school is the East Building of the National Gallery of Art on the National Mall. Designed by I.M. Pei, this building has a flat façade and high atrium that allows light to flow into the center hallways of the museum. Additionally, the exterior courtyard connecting this building with the museum's West Building includes several glass pyramids. These pyramids served as the inspiration for the pyramids I.M. Pei would later design to sit in front of the Louvre Museum in Paris. Other buildings that have Modernist elements include the National Museum of American History and the National Air and Space Museum, both on the National Mall. Also, the Kennedy Center for the Performing Arts in Foggy Bottom, the Metropolitan Community Church of Washington, D.C. in the Mount Vernon Square neighborhood as well as the Watergate Complex, located immediately north of the Kennedy Center, are Modernist buildings.

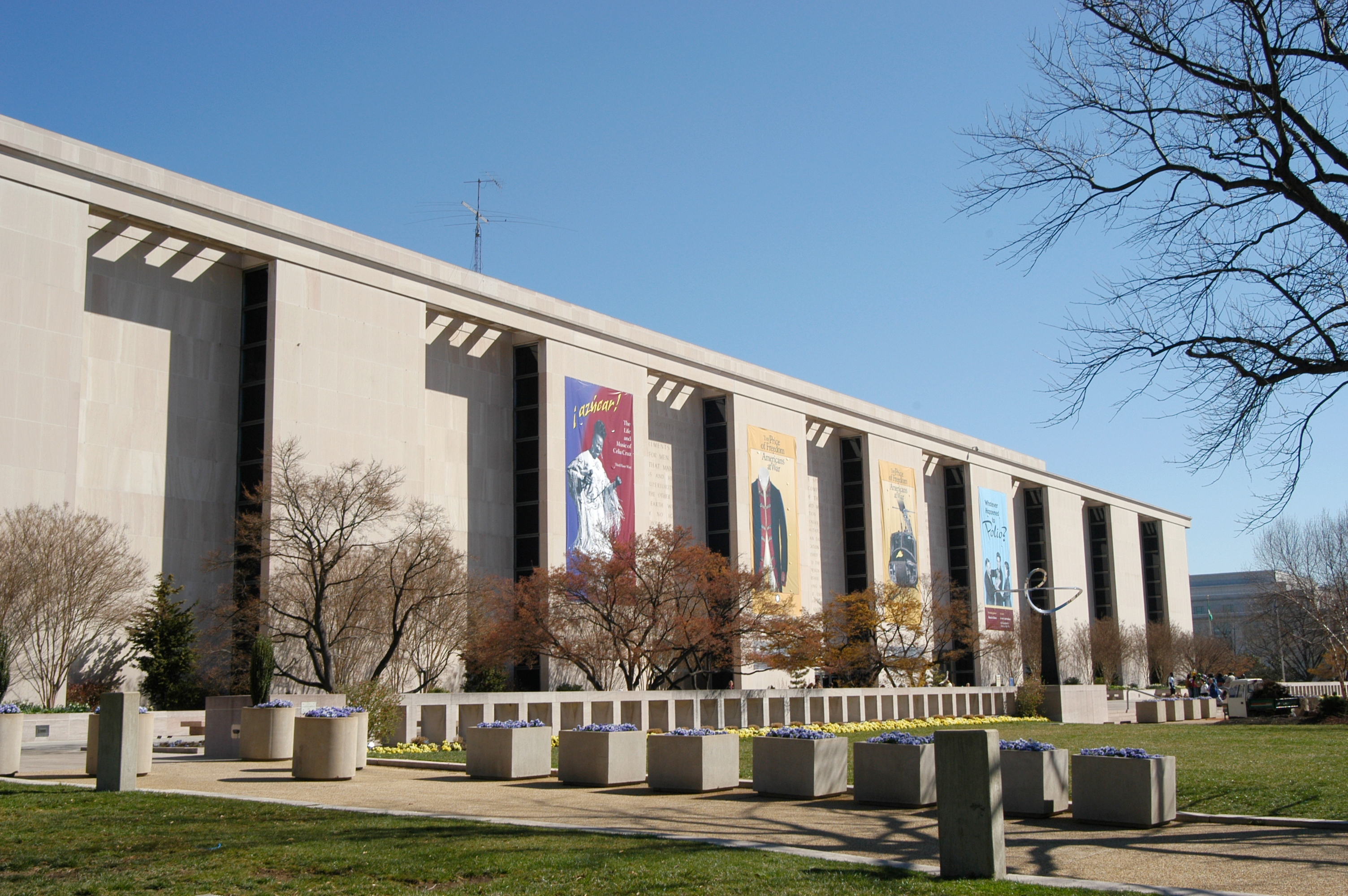
National Museum of American History (1964)

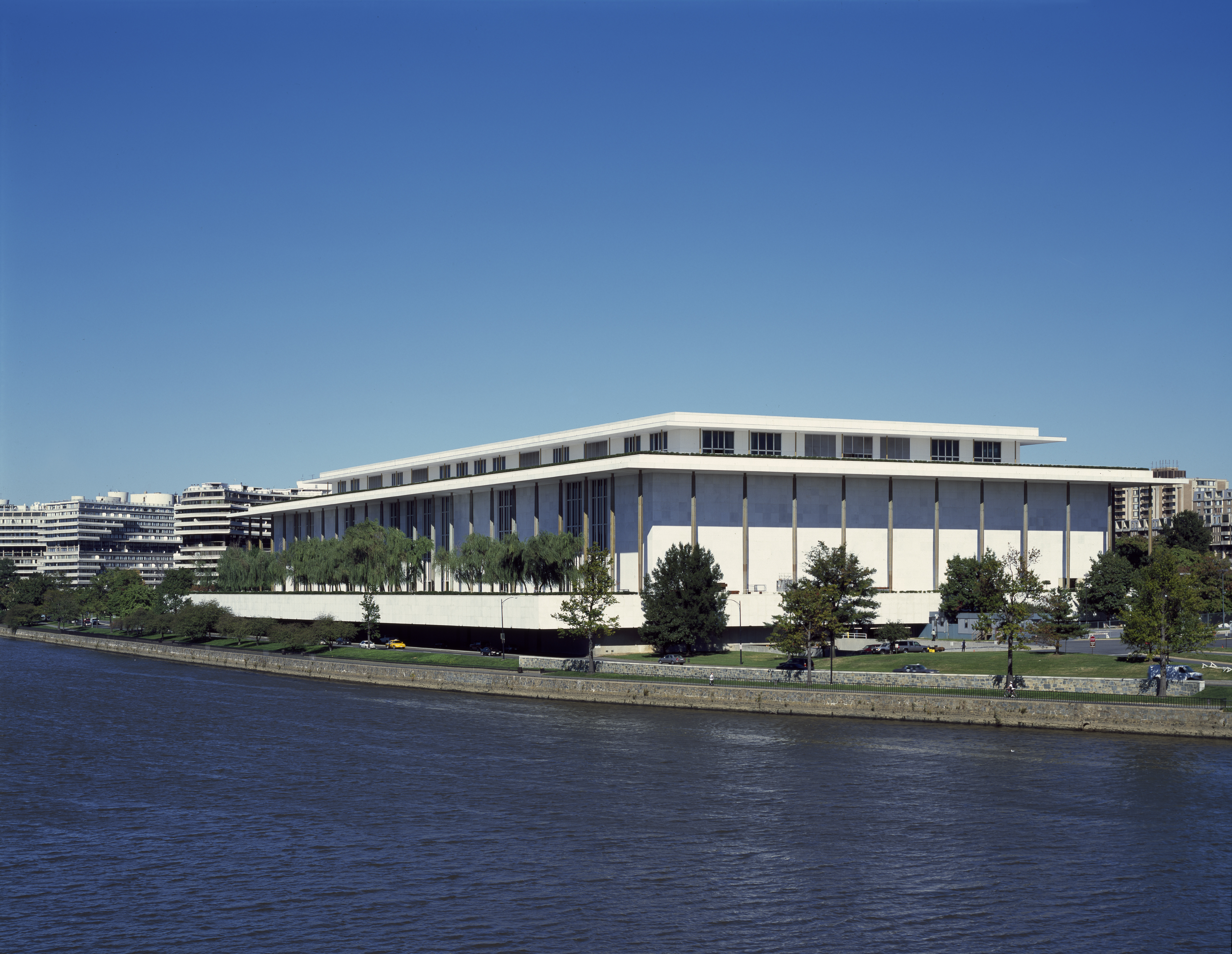
Kennedy Center for the Performing Arts (1971)

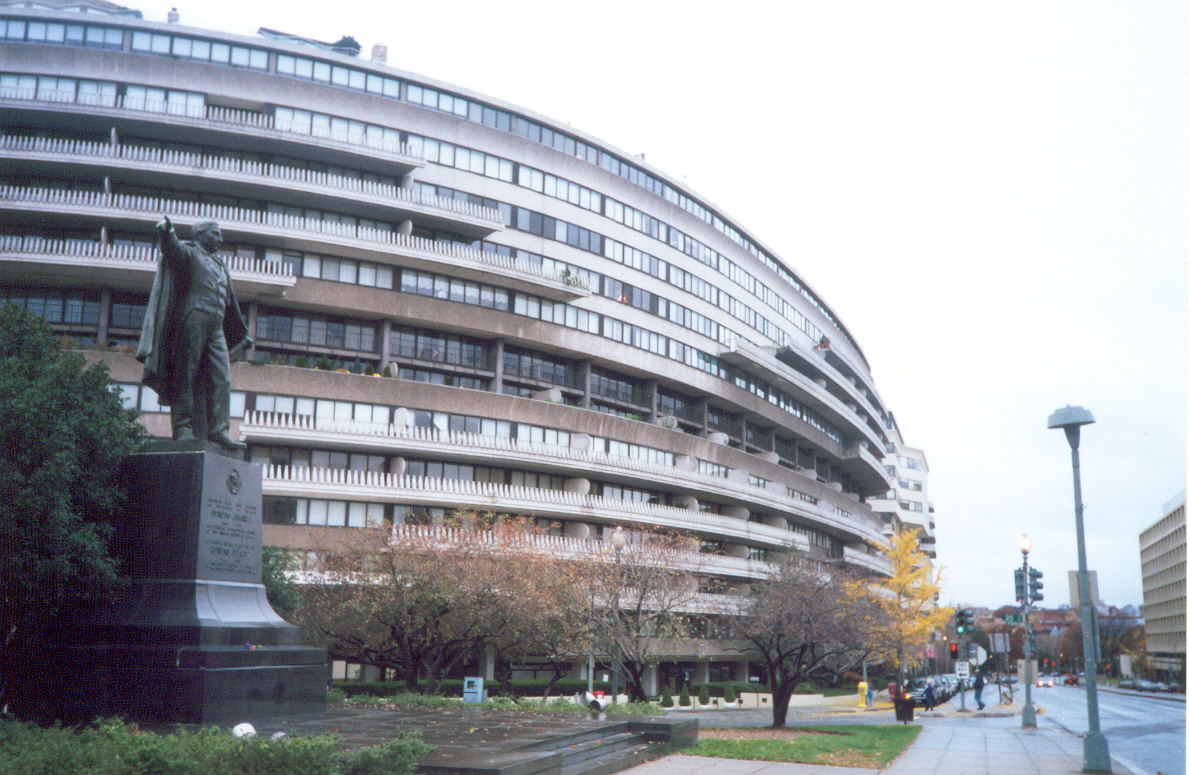
Watergate Complex (1971)

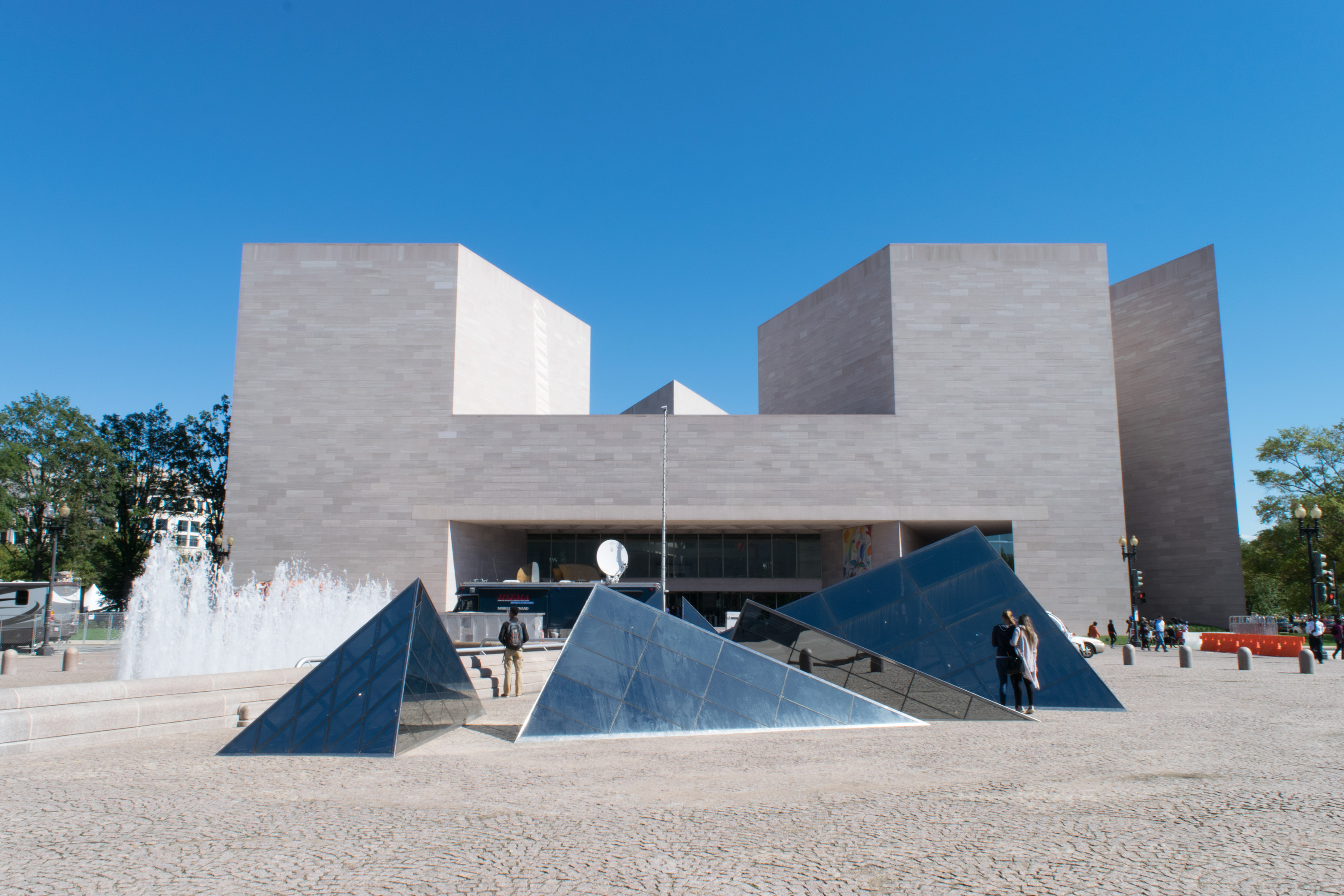
East Building of the National Gallery of Art (1978)

=== Postmodernism ===
Postmodern architecture is a broadly defined architectural style that emphasizes the use of glass, large windows, and generally greater variety of form than Modernism allowed for. Because of the broad definition of this type of architecture, many buildings built in Washington, D.C., in the latter decades of the 20th century through recent years can be said to be Postmodern. Among these buildings are the headquarters of the International Finance Corporation near Foggy Bottom, the Embassy of Spain in the West End, the World Bank Group headquarters building located Downtown, and the Embassy of Canada near the Capitol.

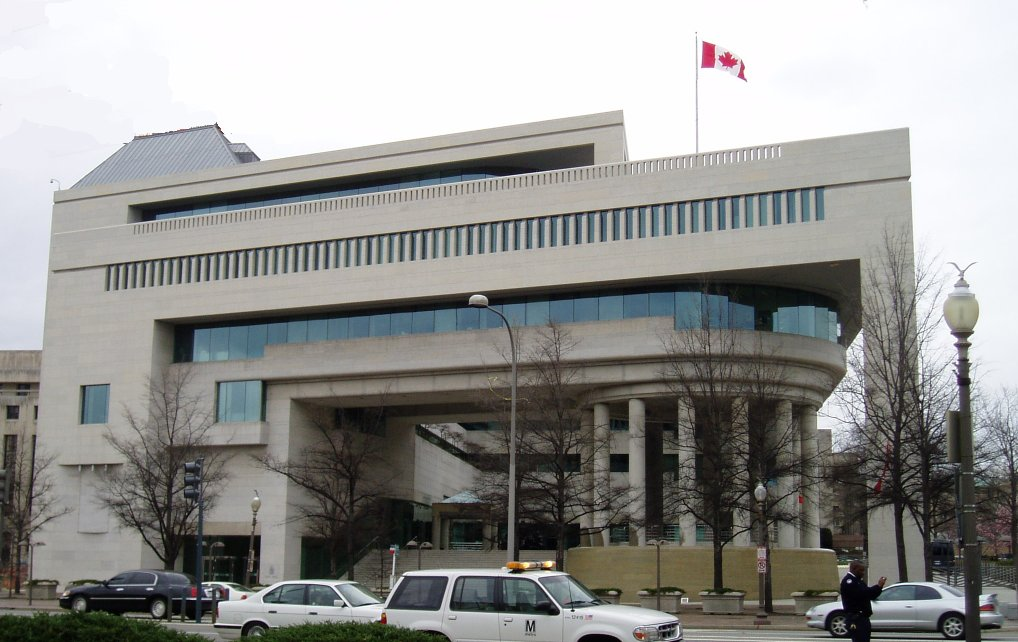
Embassy of Canada (1989)

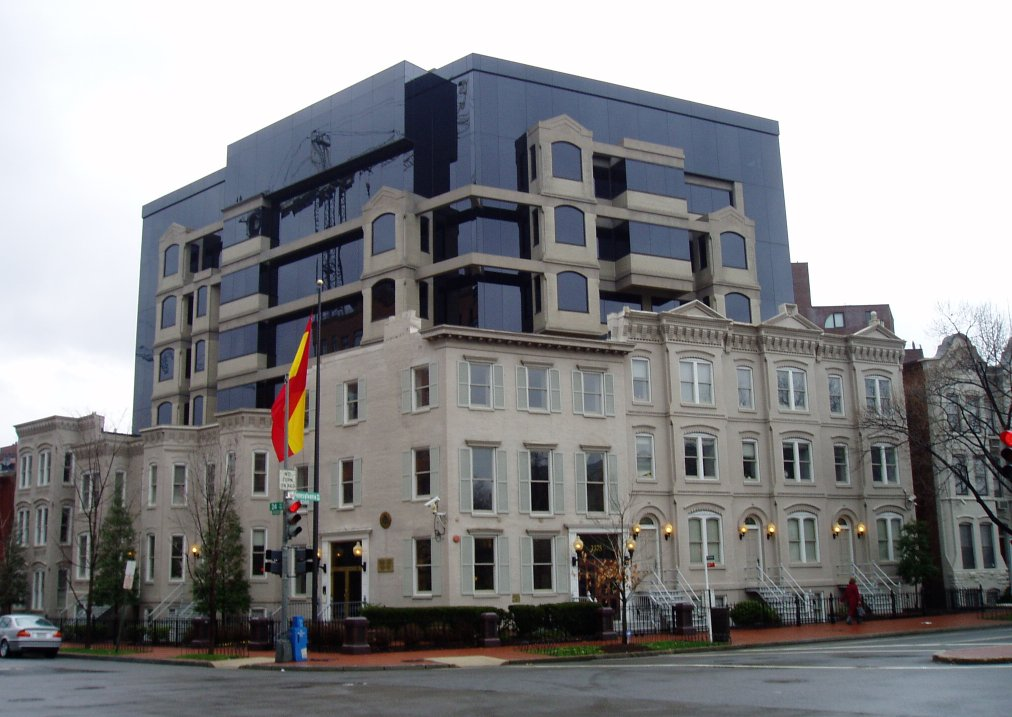
Embassy of Spain (1994)

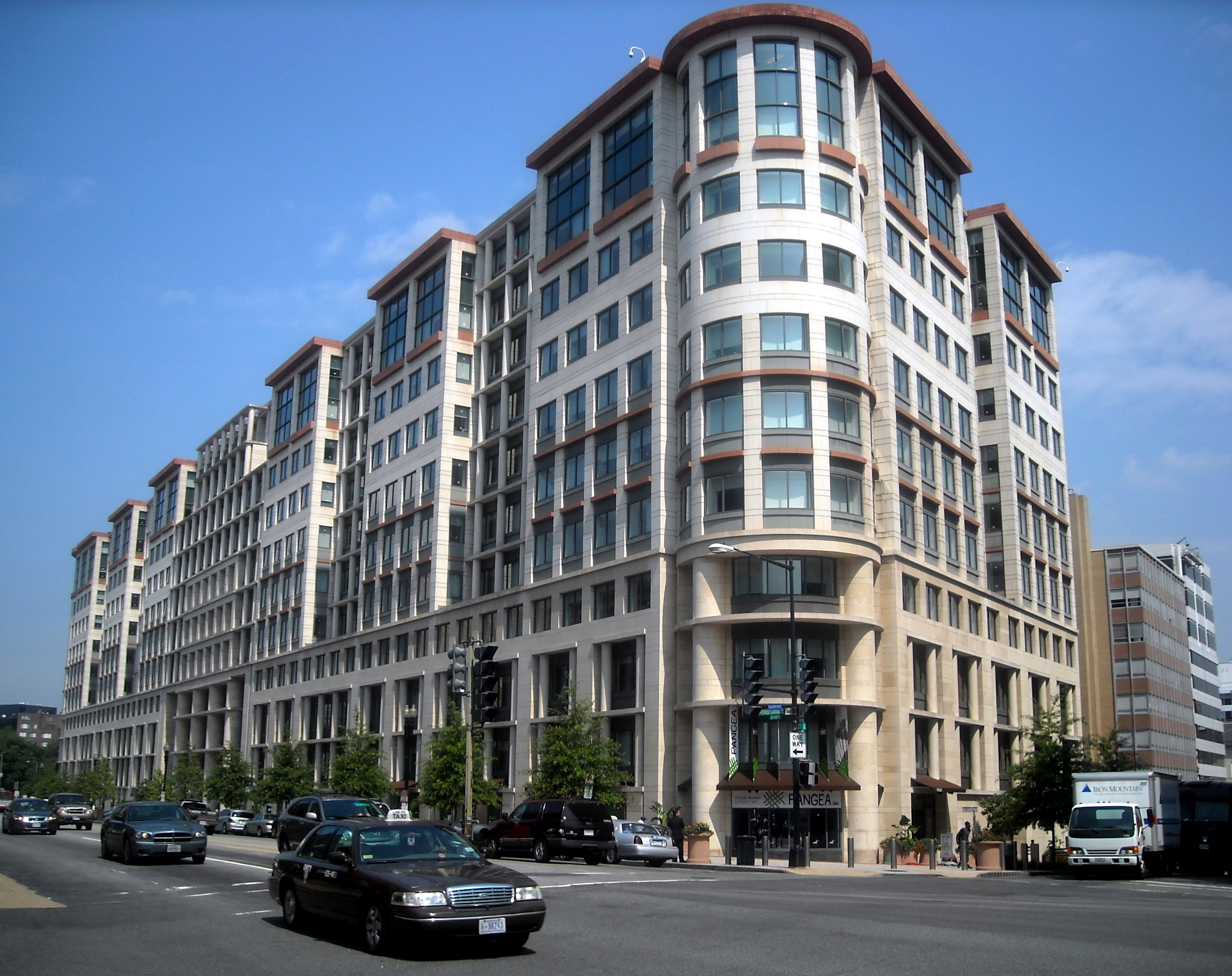
International Finance Corporation headquarters (1997)

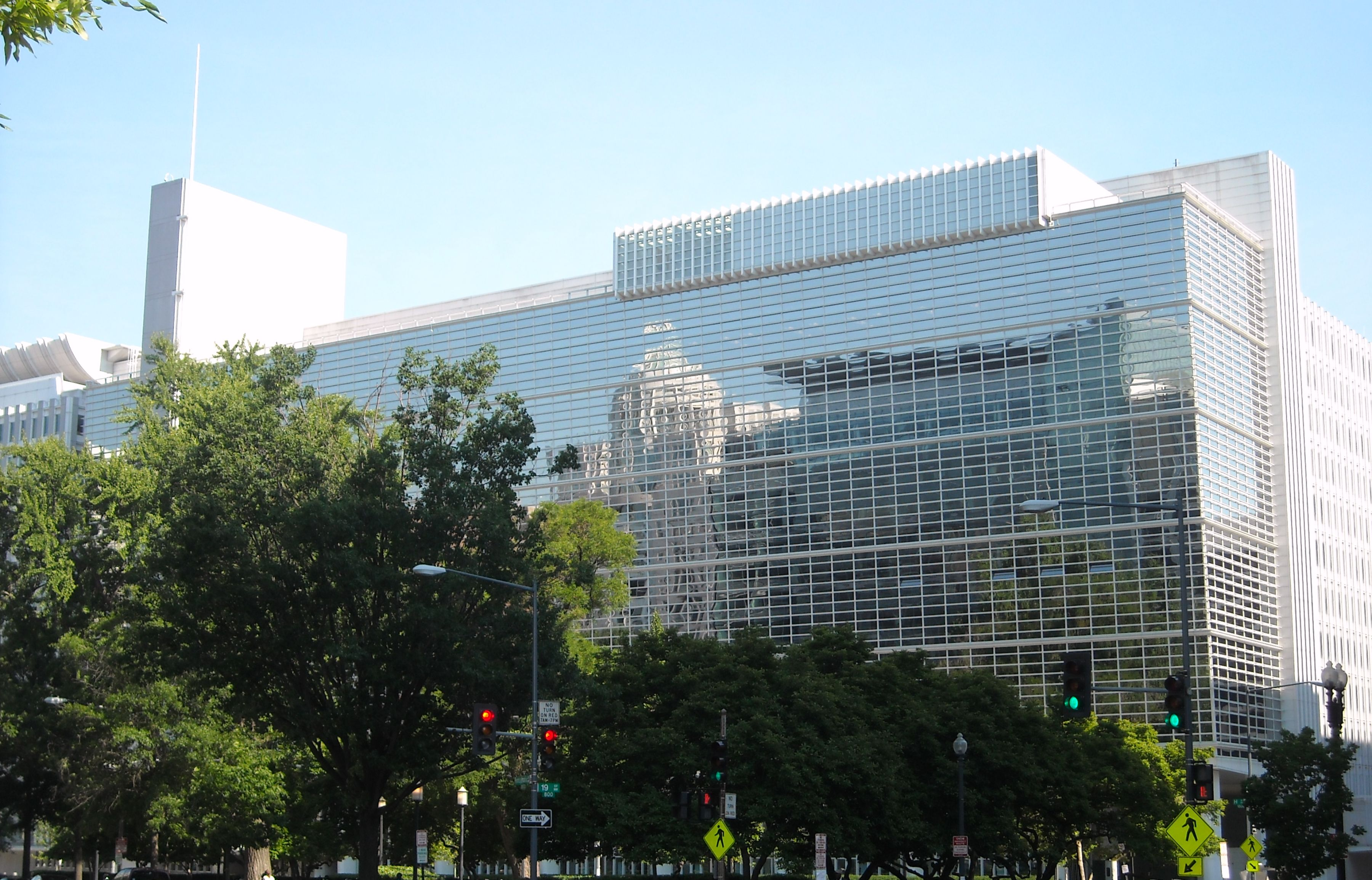
World Bank Group headquarters (1998)

=== Contemporary ===
Contemporary architecture is a wide-ranging architectural category prominent in the 21st century. Although no single style dominates this motif, contemporary architecture generally uses large glass panes and intricate, often asymmetric form to depict abstract concepts or themes. Many of the residential and office buildings constructed in Washington in the 2010s and 2020s around places such as CityCenterDC, Navy Yard, the Wharf, and throughout the Downtown portions of the city are contemporary in design, with glass and metal façades. Examples of contemporary architecture include the renovation of Arena Stage on the Southwest Waterfront, the translucent canopy over the Kogod courtyard of the Old Patent Office Building in Chinatown, the Embassy of Sweden and Iceland (known as the House of Sweden) in Georgetown, and the building housing the International Spy Museum in L'Enfant Plaza.

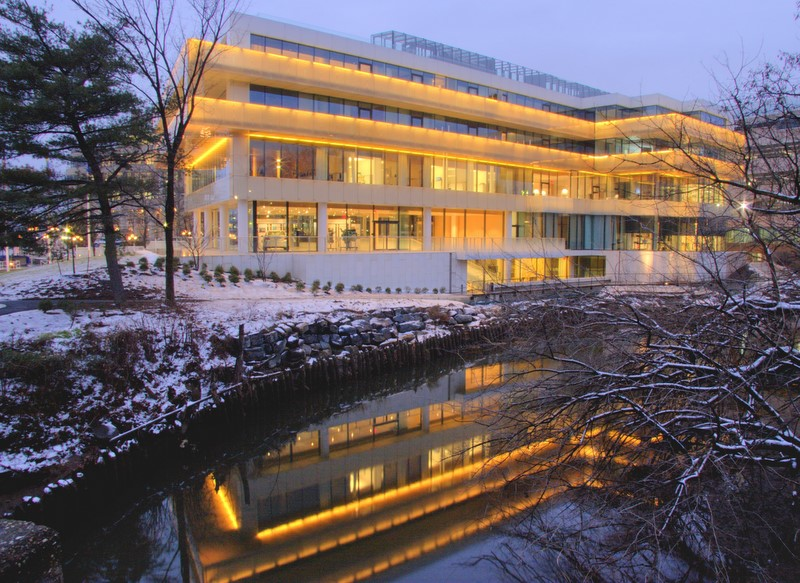
House of Sweden (2006)

Arena Stage (1950; renovated 2010)

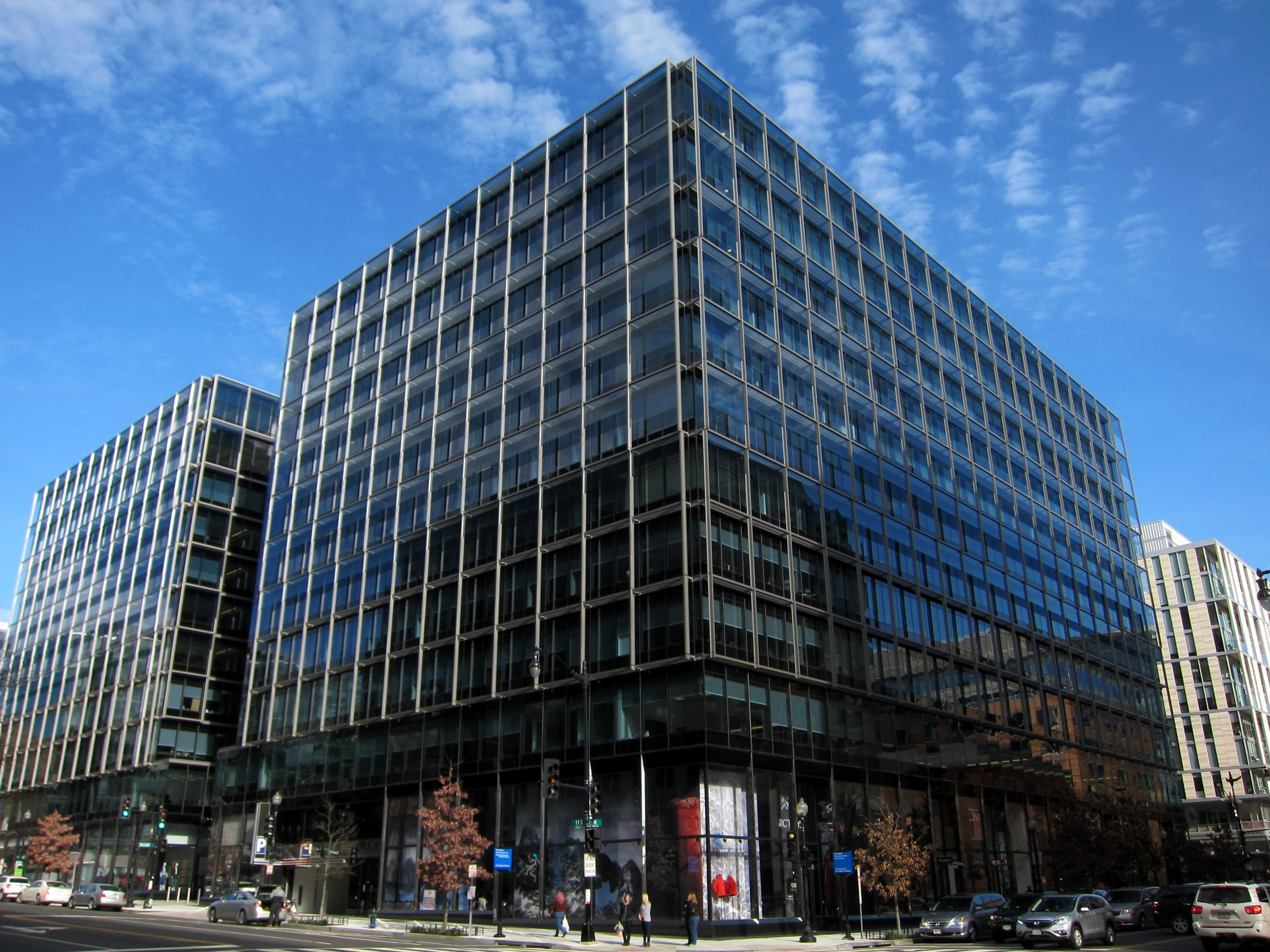
800 10th Street NW, part of the CityCenterDC complex (2013)

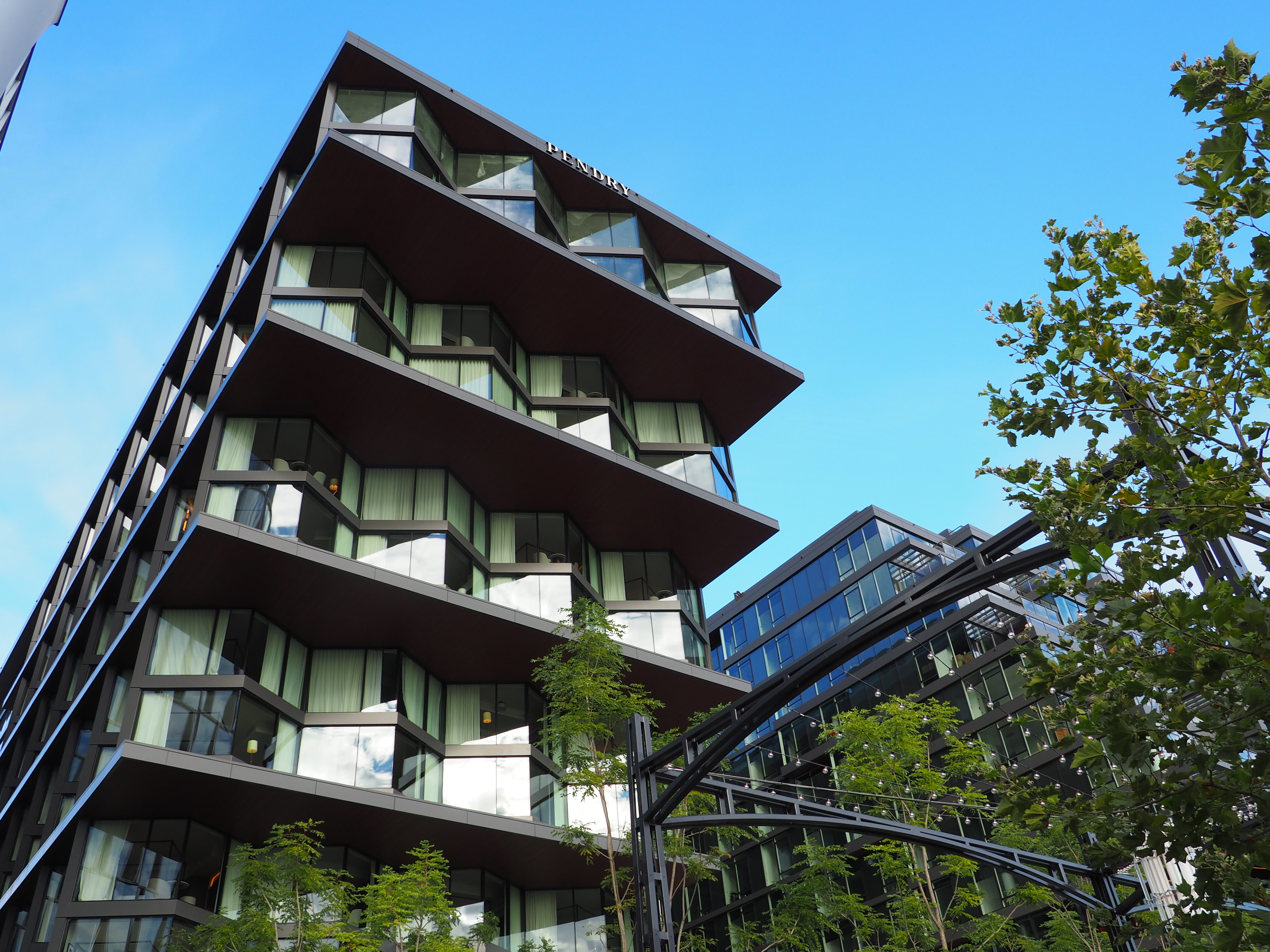
Pendry Hotel at the Wharf (2022)

=== American Craftsman and Bungalow ===
American Craftsman-type houses became popular in the D.C. area in the 20th century. These are most commonly found in Cleveland Park, Sixteenth Street Heights, and the Maryland suburbs of Kensington and Takoma Park.

== Monuments and memorials ==
In addition to the city's historic government buildings, Washington is best known for its numerous monuments and memorials. These structures have been built in various architectural styles and are scattered throughout the city, though many are located on the National Mall and Tidal Basin. The Lincoln Memorial and Jefferson Memorial are both noted examples of Neoclassical temples, and are two of the most recognizable architectural structures in the city. Each temple has a statue of their respective figure. The statue of Abraham Lincoln, designed by Daniel Chester French, is in Georgia marble, while the statue of Thomas Jefferson, designed by Rudulph Evans, is in bronze. The Washington Monument is a large Neoclassical obelisk at the center of the National Mall in honor of the country's first president, George Washington. Inside the monument's western alcove is a bronze statue of Washington. The World War II Memorial sits at the eastern end of the Lincoln Memorial Reflecting Pool and was designed with elements of Neoclassical architecture, particularly in the arched towers representing the states and territories during the conflict.

Famous memorials in more modern architectural styles include the Vietnam Veterans Memorial and the Korean War Veterans Memorial, both on the mall. The Franklin Delano Roosevelt Memorial along the Tidal Basin is designed to tell the story of Roosevelt's presidency. The Martin Luther King Jr. Memorial on the Tidal Basin includes a large statue of King walking out of a stone, representing his quote "Out of the mountain of despair, a stone of hope" delivered during his 1963 "I Have a Dream Speech" at the Lincoln Memorial.

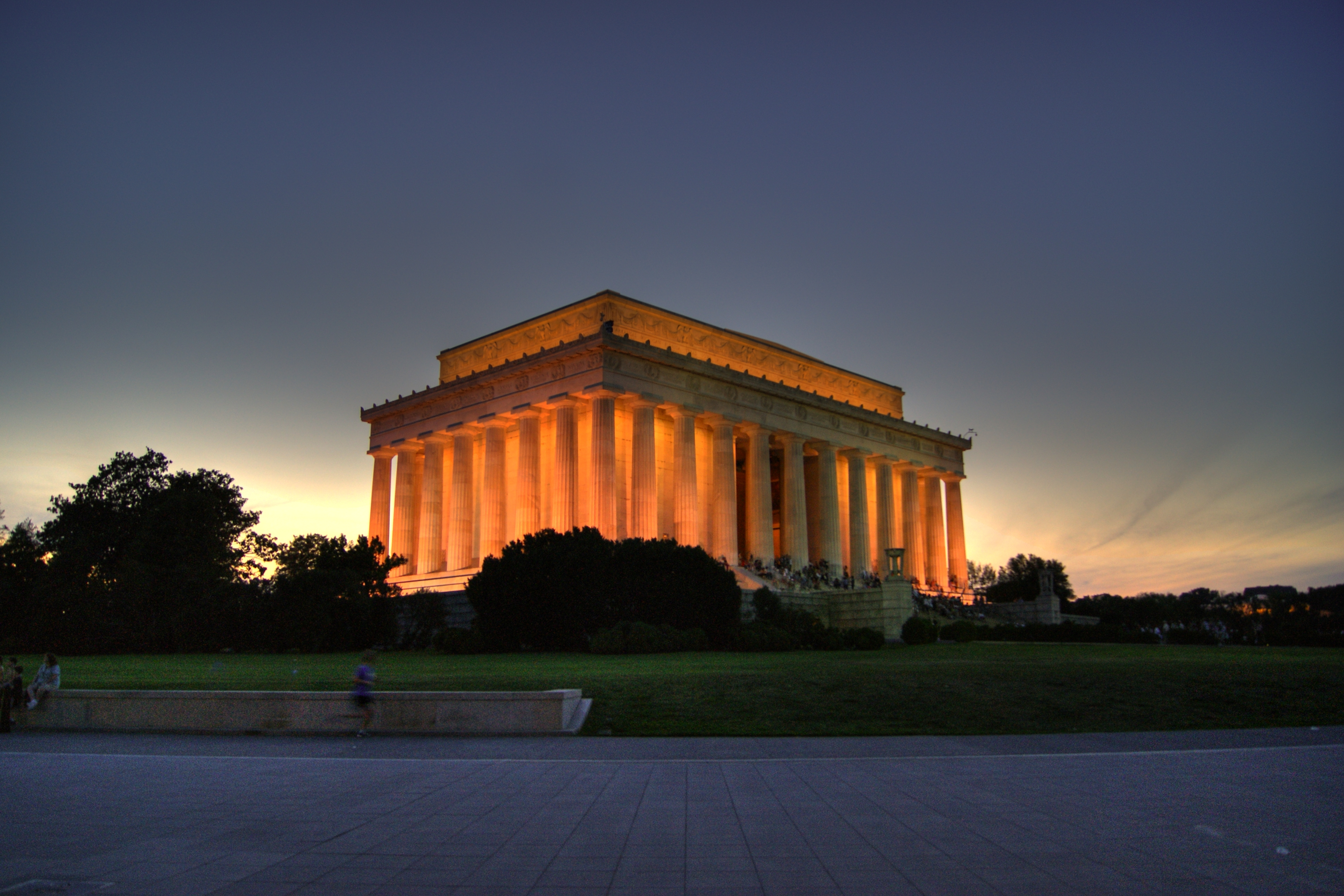
Lincoln Memorial (1922)

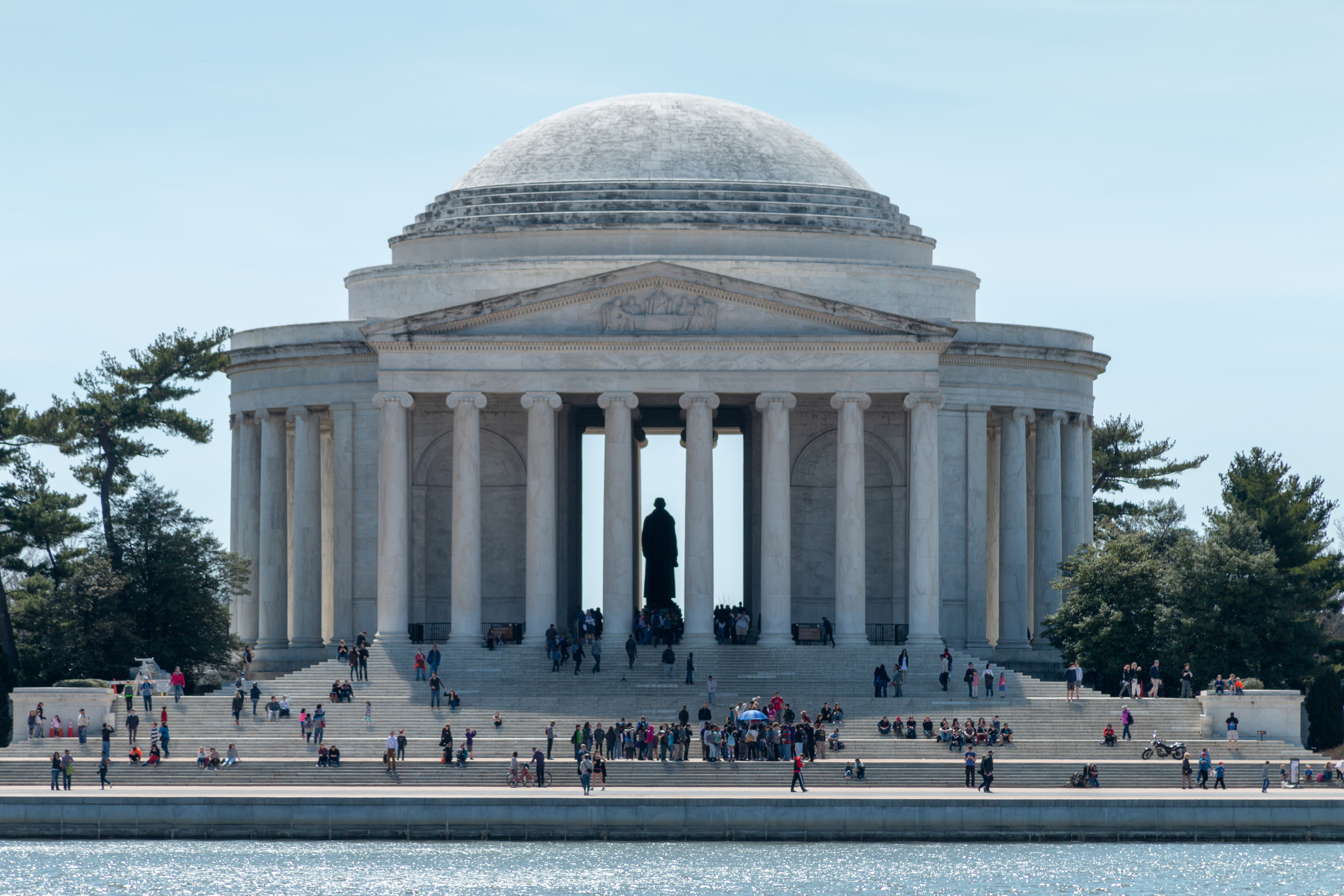
Jefferson Memorial (1943)

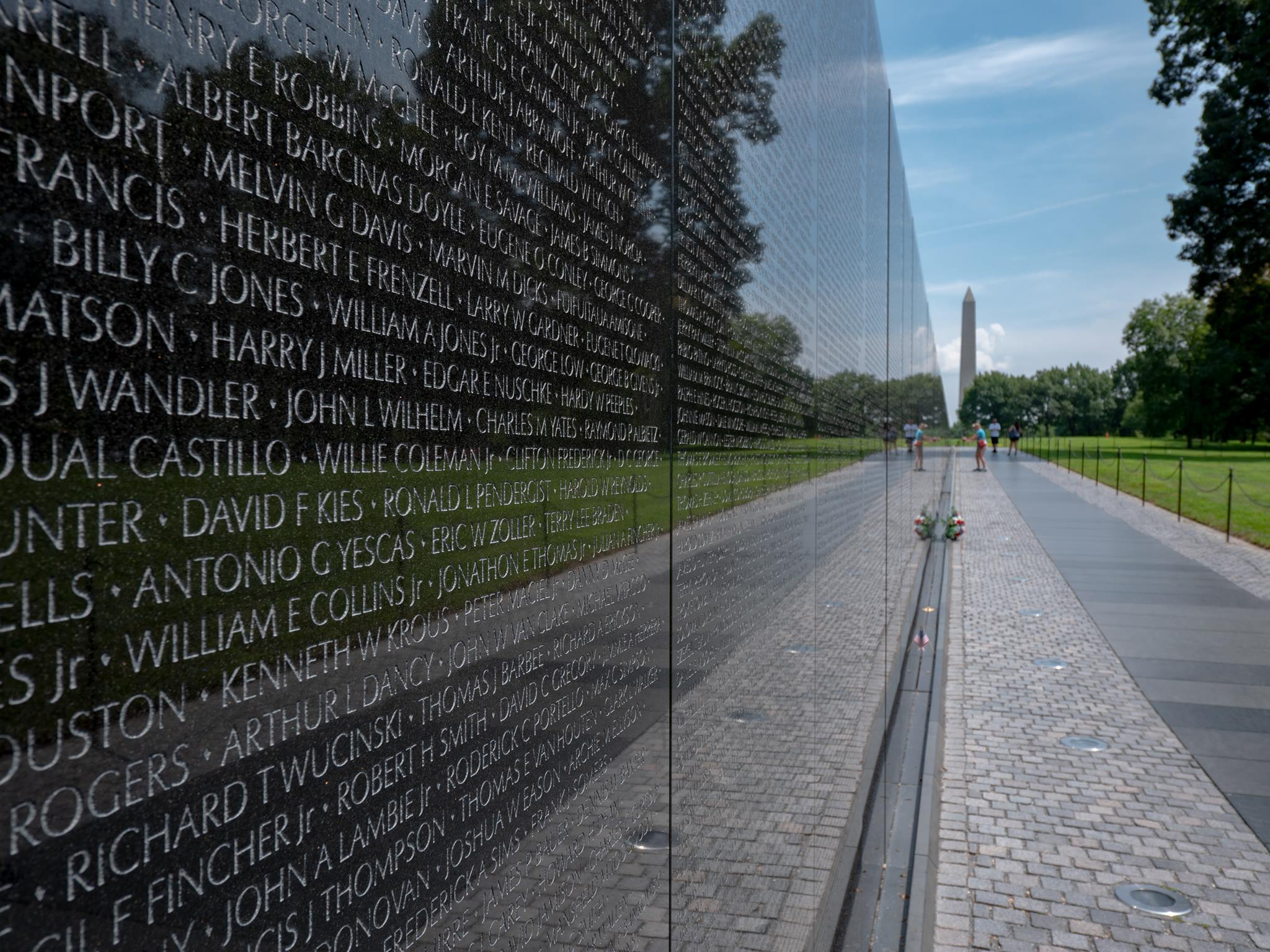
Vietnam Veterans Memorial (1982)

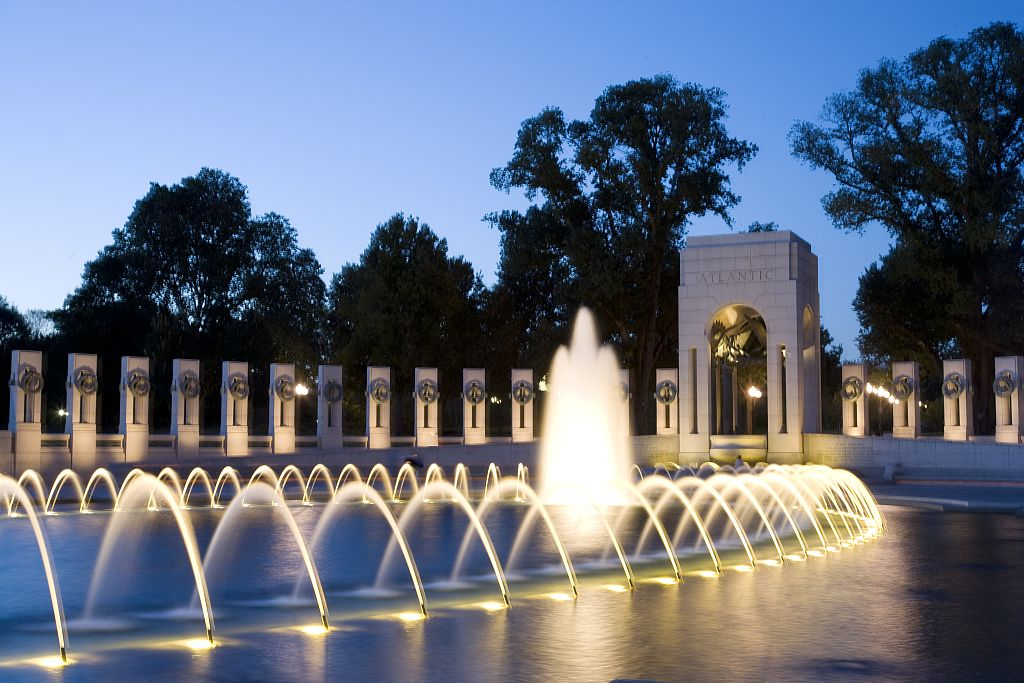
National World War II Memorial (2004)

== Bridges ==
Washington, D.C. has many bridges that cross its rivers, the Potomac and Anacostia, as well as bridges allowing for pedestrian and vehicular traffic to travel over land obstacles. Many of the city's historic bridges, such as the Taft Bridge in Rock Creek Park, the Duke Ellington Bridge in Rock Creek Park, the Key Bridge over the Potomac, and the Arlington Memorial Bridge, also over the Potomac, are Neoclassical bridges with large arches made of heavy stone. The Frederick Douglass Memorial Bridge across the Anacostia was originally opened in 1950 as a swing bridge, but was recreated and reopened in 2021 as a through arch bridge. The Woodrow Wilson Bridge, which touches the southern tip of the city across the Potomac, is a double-leaf bascule bridge (or drawbridge). The Arlington Memorial Bridge also has a central bascule which can open to allow river traffic to cross. Boulder Bridge is a historic Melan-style stone bridge in Rock Creek Park.

Other bridges in the city are less artistically detailed girder or beam bridges, such as the Theodore Roosevelt Bridge over the Potomac and the 11th Street Bridges over the Anacostia. The Long Bridge is a railroad truss bridge that takes rail traffic between Washington and Virginia across the Potomac.

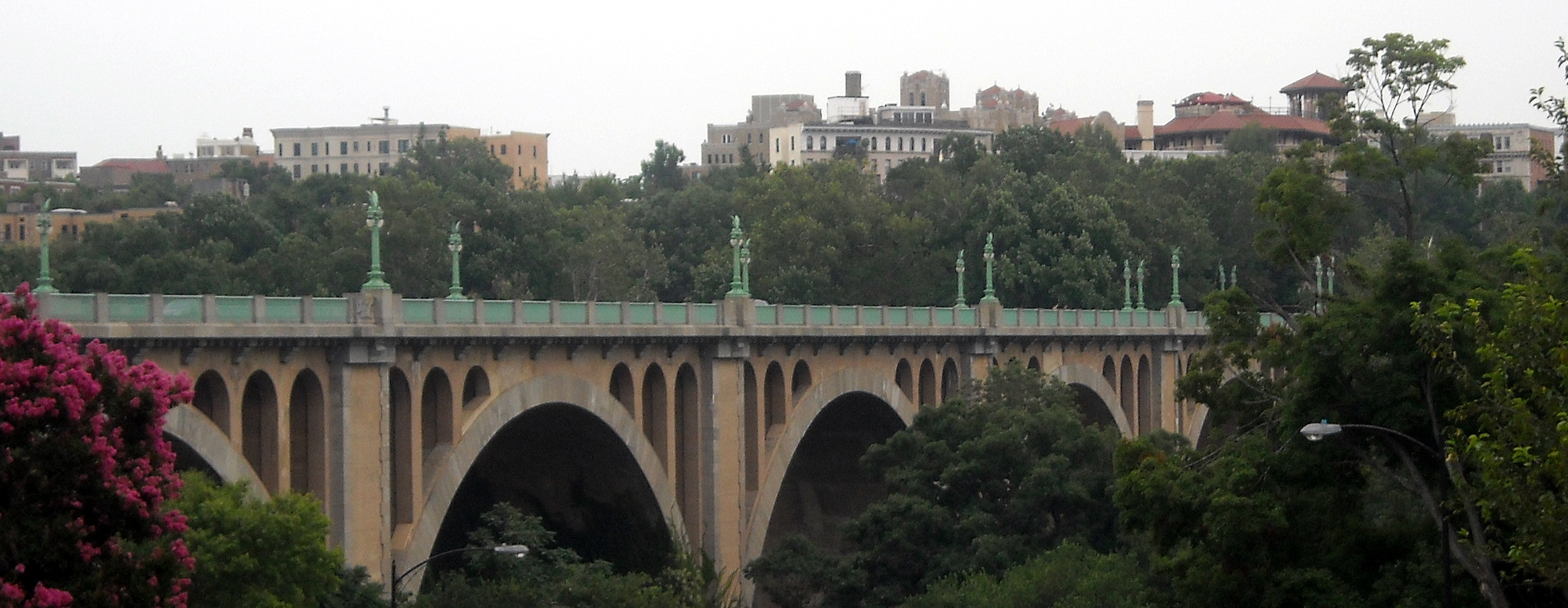
Taft Bridge (1906)

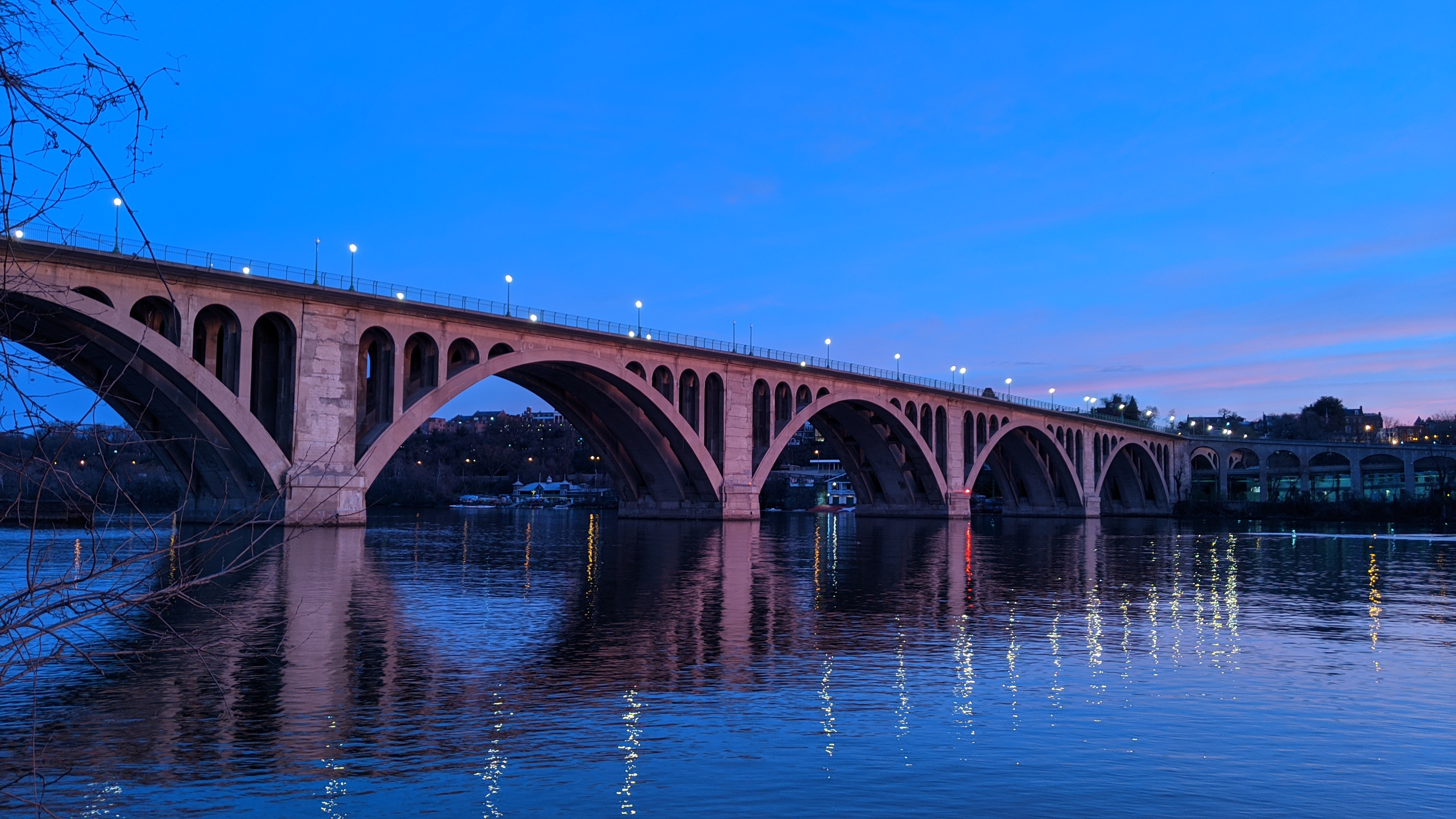
Francis Scott Key Bridge (1923)

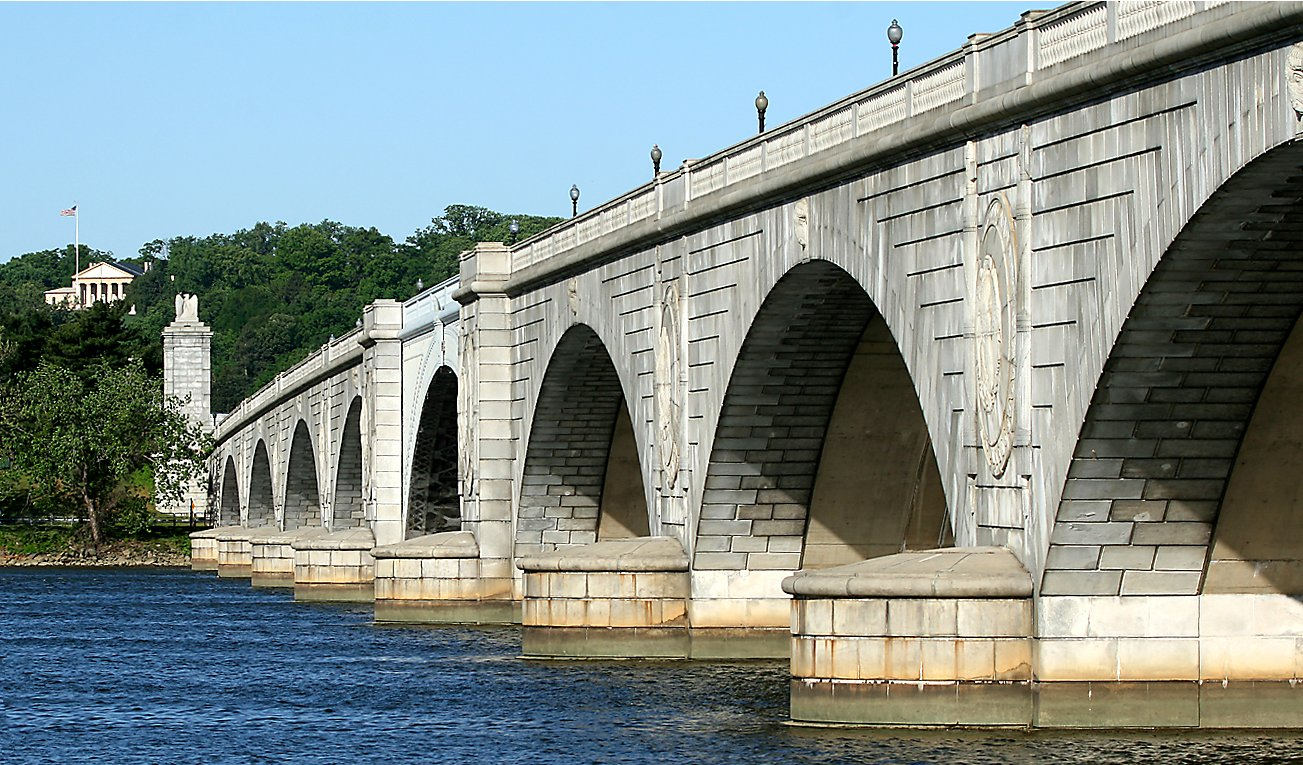
Arlington Memorial Bridge (1932)

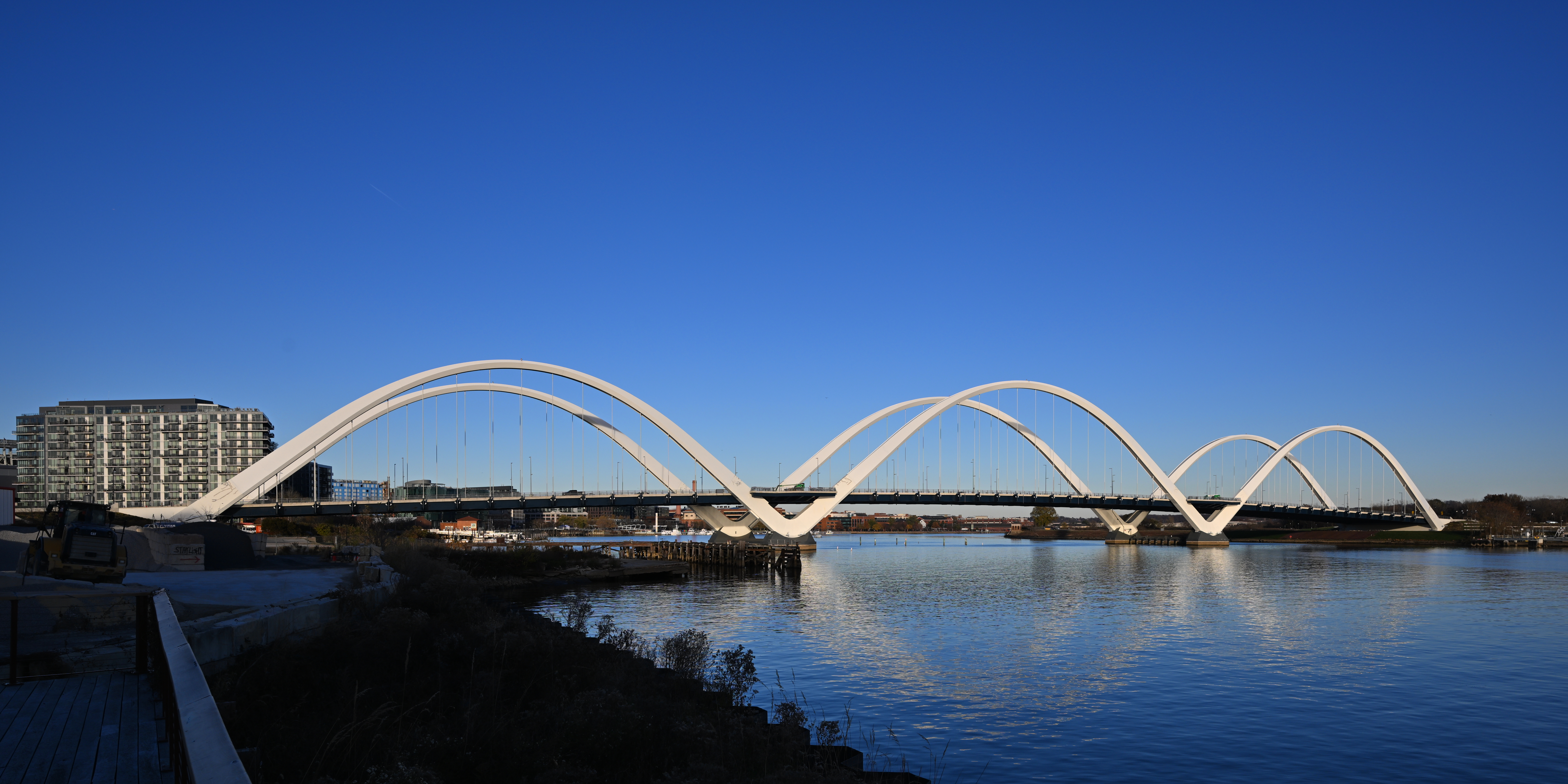
Frederick Douglass Memorial Bridge (original 1950; replacement 2021)

== See also ==
- List of National Historic Landmarks in Washington, D.C.
- National Register of Historic Places listings in Washington, D.C.
- List of tallest buildings in the Washington metropolitan area
