= Union Stage =

Music venue in Washington, D.C. US

- Interactive map of Union Stage
- Address: 740 Water St SW, Washington, DC 20024
- Location: Washington, D.C., United States
- Coordinates: 38°52′44″N 77°1′26″W
- Owner: The Brindley Brothers
- Capacity: 450
- Type: Club

Construction
- Opened: December 29, 2017

Website
- Union Stage

Union Stage is an indoor music venue, club, and bar in Washington, D.C. It is located in The Wharf neighborhood of Southwest Waterfront.

== Background ==
It is located in The Wharf neighborhood of Southwest Waterfront, the venue is surrounded by several hotels, residential buildings, restaurants, shops, piers, as well as other music venues (including The Anthem and Pearl Street Warehouse).

The first concert at Union Stage took place on Dec 29, 2017 and included The Duskwhales, Milo in the Doldrums, and Kid Brother. The venue features 7,500 feet (2,300 m) square foot of floor space with a tap room and bar.
