= Hoffman & Associates =

Real-estate development company in Washington D.C., US

- Industry: Development Redevelopment Construction,
- Founded: 1993
- Founder: Monty Hoffman
- Headquarters: Washington, D.C. Raleigh, North Carolina
- Area served: United States
- Key people: Monty Hoffman (Founder & Chairman); Maria Thompson (President)
- Number of employees: 50-60
- Website: www.hoffman-dev.com

Hoffman & Associates (formerly PN Hoffman & Associates) is a privately held real estate development company based in Washington D.C. most known for mixed-use and urban developments. The company has completed approximately seventy developments in the Washington D.C. area, including The Wharf development on D.C.'s Southwest Waterfront. The company's headquarters are in Washington D.C., with additional offices in Raleigh, Charlotte, and Richmond.

== History ==
Hoffman & Associates was founded in 1993 as PN Hoffman by current CEO Monty Hoffman and former partner Pete Nazelrod. The company initially produced luxury condos in the D.C. area and incorporated green and sustainable practices into designs. The Alta at Thomas Circle, completed in 2006, was the first LEED-certified residential building in Washington D.C.

During April 2023, it was announced that Mary Beth Avedesian has been appointed as Senior Vice President of Development for the organization, and will manage several major projects across the region, including the company's large-scale, community-focused development in Falls Church.

=== Southwest Waterfront Development ===
In September 2006, the company was selected to develop the portion of the District's Southwest Waterfront now known as The Wharf. Hoffman ultimately partnered with Madison Marquette to build The Wharf and the first phase of the development opened in October 2017. The Wharf is operated by Hoffman-Madison Waterfront, a joint venture between Hoffman & Associates and Madison Marquette. The second phase of the project was projected to be complete in 2022 and covers nearly one mile of the waterfront and contain more than 3 million square feet of mixed use space. The total cost of the development was estimated to be $2.5 billion. In April 2025, Hoffman along with Madison Marquette sold their interest in The Wharf property to PSP Investments at a $1.8B valuation.

As part of the project to redevelop the Southwest Waterfront, Hoffman also redeveloped the historic Riverside Baptist Church and St. Augustine's Church in Southwest D.C.

==== Additional D.C. Development ====
In 2014, the company was chosen to build a residential building at The Yards, the 42-acre development on D.C.'s Anacostia River waterfront. The Bower was the first for-sale condominium in The Yards.

In May 2019, the company entered into a partnership with EYA, and Regency Centers to develop a 9.4-acre section of Falls Church, Virginia into mixed-use development. Initially dubbed Little City Commons, the project was later designated as West Falls to better integrate with surrounding developments. The project experienced a slowdown during the 2020 COVID-19 pandemic and ground breaking was planned for sometime in 2021. The site includes 1.2 million square-feet of mixed use space and a 99-year lease on the property is expected to bring the city of Falls Church as much as $44.5 million. The project was complete in September 2025 and includes 123,000 square-feet of retail space and 18,000 square-feet of public green space.

=== Expansion ===
In December 2018, the company acquired Seaboard Station in downtown Raleigh, North Carolina and is planning a redevelopment of the space valued at $300 million and will open in 2022. In 2019, Hoffman & Associates was selected as the development partner for GoTriangle's Raleigh Union Station Bus Facility project. In 2025, Hoffman was named as the lead developer on GoTriangle's Research Triangle Park's mixed-use transit center project. The Triangle Mobility Hub takes place on 19-acres and will be a multi-modal transit center with residential, commercial, and retail spaces included. In 2024, the project received a $25 million grant from the U.S. Department of Transportation.

In June 2023, the company expanded into Charlotte, North Carolina and Richmond, Virginia.

=== Awards ===
Year	Award	Awarding Entity	Project/Awardee
2019	ULI Global Awards for Excellence	Urban Land Institute	The Wharf Phase 1
2020	Jack Kemp Excellence in Affordable Housing	Urban Land Institute	The Wharf Phase 1
