= Thomas Law House =

Historic house in Washington, D.C., United States

- U.S. National Register of Historic Places
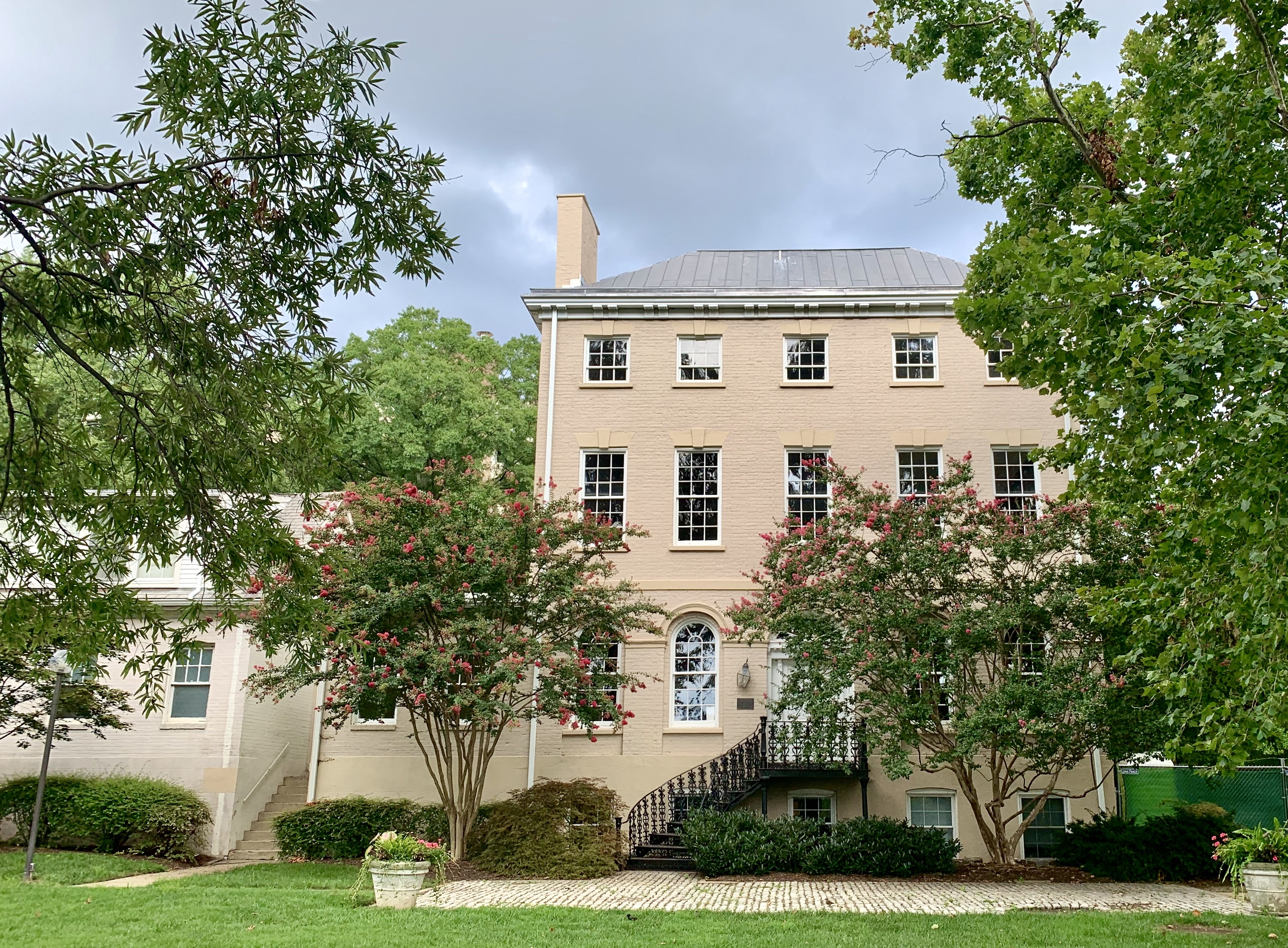
- The Thomas Law House in 2019

- Location within Washington, D.C.
- Location: 1252 6th Street, S.W. Washington, D.C.
- Coordinates: 38°52′29.3″N 77°01′11″W
- Built: 1796; 230 years ago
- Architect: William Lovering
- Architectural style: Federal
- NRHP reference No.: 73002093
- Added to NRHP: August 14, 1973

The Thomas Law House (Honeymoon House) was constructed between 1794 and 1796 near present-day 6th and N Streets SW in the Southwest Waterfront neighborhood of Washington, D.C. The builder was a syndicate headed by James Greenleaf, an early land speculator in the District of Columbia.

In March 1796, Thomas Law moved into the house after his marriage to Martha Washington's eldest granddaughter, Eliza Parke Custis. The house became known as "Honeymoon House" as the Laws lived there during their honeymoon while awaiting completion of their house. They did not stay long, as by the summer of 1796 they moved to their home on the west side of New Jersey Avenue north of C Street.

Thomas Law was the son of Edmund Law, the Bishop of Carlisle. Among his brothers were:

- John Law, Bishop of Clonfert and Kilmacduagh, Bishop of Killala and Achonry, and Bishop of Elphin.
- Edward Law, 1st Baron Ellenborough, Lord Chief Justice 1802–1818.
- George Henry Law, Bishop of Chester 1812–1824, Bishop of Bath and Wells 1824–1845.

Thomas Law spent many years in India, where he made a fortune in trade. Law came to Washington, D.C., in the summer of 1794. He was one of Washington's wealthiest citizens and was active, although not successful, in business enterprises. He eventually lost his fortune.

Law met Greenleaf in November or December 1794 and was deeply impressed with him. On December 4, 1794, Greenleaf sold 500 city lots to Law for £50,000 (or $133,000). The price per lot was $297.60, a 372 percent increase over the $80 per lot which Greenleaf had paid just a year earlier.

In 1816, former Congressman Richard Bland Lee and his wife Elizabeth (Collins) Lee purchased the house.

During the Civil War, it was the Mt. Vernon Hotel. Starting around 1913, it was the Washington Sanitarium's Mission Hospital. Dr. Henry G. Hadley operated a clinic in the house from 1923 to 1961.

The National Park Service listed the Thomas Law House on the National Register of Historic Places on August 14, 1973.

== Bibliography ==
- Bryan, Wilhelmus B. A History of the National Capital: From Its Foundation Through the Period of the Adoption of the Organic Act. New York: Macmillan, 1914.
- Clark, Allen. Greenleaf and Law in the Federal City. Washington, D.C.: Press of W.F. Roberts, 1901.
- Dowd, Mary-Jane M. Records of the Office of Public Buildings and Public Parks of the National Capital: Record Group 42, Inventory No. 16. Washington, D.C.: National Archives and Records Administration, 1992.
- Livermore, Shaw. Early American Land Companies: Their Influence on Corporate Development. Reprint ed. Washington, D.C.: Beard Books, 1999.
