= Randall Junior High School =

- U.S. National Register of Historic Places
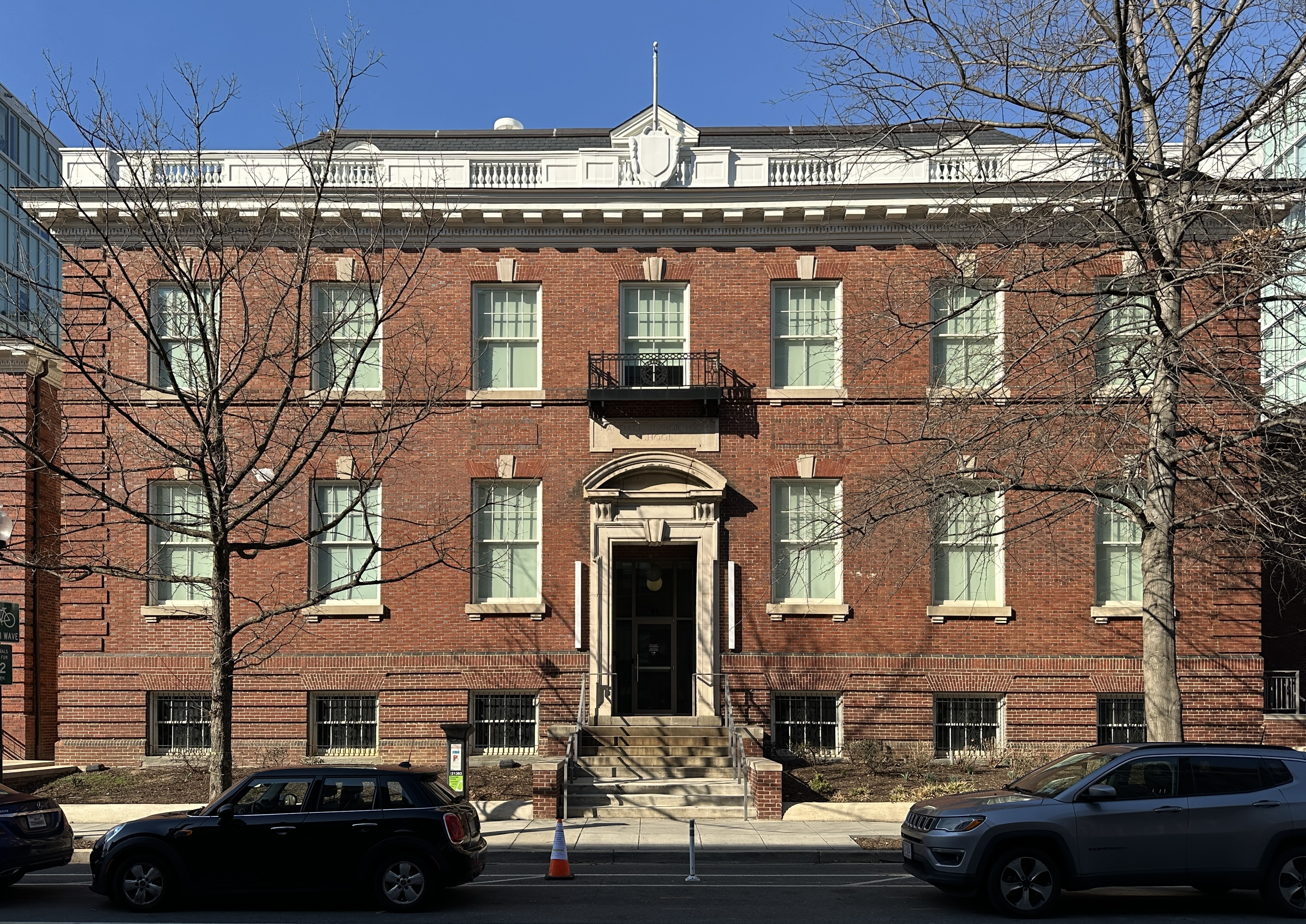
- Randall Junior High School in 2026 following renovation

- Location within Central Washington, D.C. Location within the District of Columbia Location within the United States
- Location: 65 I Street, S.W. Washington, D.C.
- Coordinates: 38°52′45.48″N 77°0′39.18″W
- Area: 2.7 acres (1.1 ha)
- Built: 1906
- Architect: Marsh & Peter
- Architectural style: Colonial Revival
- Restored: 2022
- Restored by: The Christman Company
- MPS: Public School Buildings of Washington, DC MPS
- NRHP reference No.: 08001205
- Added to NRHP: December 22, 2008

Randall Junior High School is a historic building at 65 I Street, Southwest, Washington, D.C.

== History ==
The school opened in 1906 as Cardozo Elementary School and expanded to its 80,000 sq ft (7,400 m^{2}) size in 1927 in the process of becoming Randall Junior High School. Singer Marvin Gaye attended Randall and graduated in 1954. The school closed in 1978. Then it became a high school career development center called Dix Street Academy until 1981. After that, it served as a homeless shelter until 2004, and as artist's studios, the Millenium Arts Center.

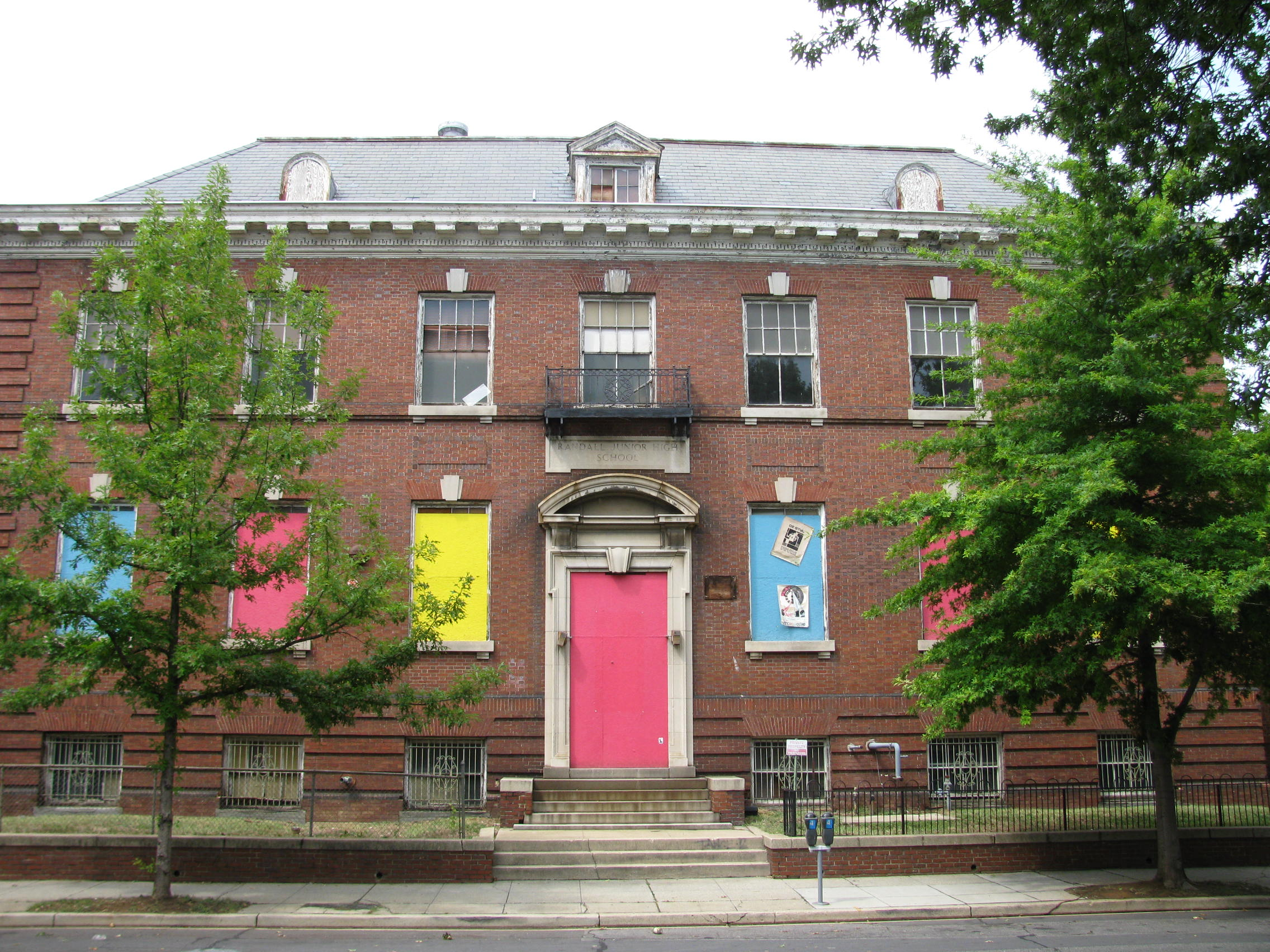
Randall Junior High School in 2011, prior to renovation

In 2006, the Corcoran Gallery of Art purchased the building from the City of Washington for $6.2 million. The initial redevelopment with developer Monument Realty LLC fell through. In 2010, a Telesis/Rubell group bought the property for $6.5 million and planned to redevelop the property beginning in 2012.

The District had the option to reacquire the property in 2018, but did not do so.

In 2022, the Rubell Museum, a Miami-based private contemporary art museum, announced the opening of a second museum location, to be sited in the Randall School building. The museum owners purchased the property and renovated the main school building for the new museum, adding a multi-story apartment building next to the original structure. The museum opened in October 2022.
