= The Wharf (Washington, D.C.) =

Mixed-use development in Washington, D.C.

District Wharf
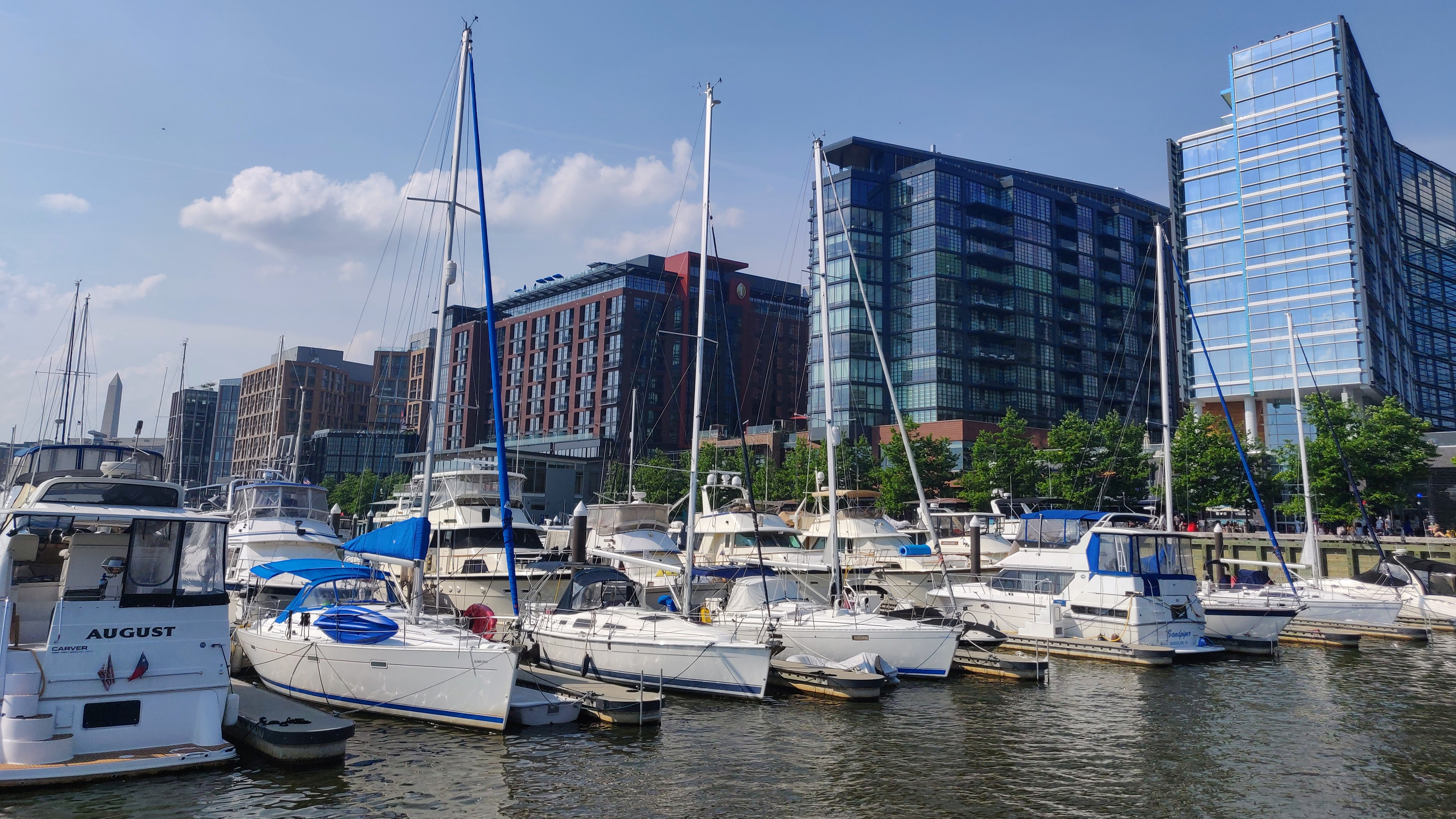
- Interactive map of District Wharf
- Location: Washington, D.C., U.S.
- Coordinates: 38.879393°N 77.024698°W
- Status: Completed
- Groundbreaking: 2014
- Opening: 2017 (first phase); 2022 (final phase)
- Use: Mixed-use
- Website: WharfDC.com

Companies
- Developer: Hoffman & Associates, Madison Marquette
- Manager: Hoffman Madison Waterfront

Technical details
- Cost: $3.6 billion
- Size: 24 acres (9.7 ha)

The District Wharf, commonly known simply as The Wharf, is a multi-billion dollar mixed-use development on the Southwest Waterfront in Washington, D.C. It contains the city's historic Maine Avenue Fish Market, hotels, residential buildings, restaurants, shops, parks, piers, docks and marinas, and live music venues. The first phase of The Wharf opened in October 2017 and the second and final phase was completed in October 2022. The neighborhood encompasses 24 acres (9.7 hectares) of land, 50 acres (20 hectares) of water, and contain 3.2 million square feet (300,000 m^{2}) of retail, residential, and entertainment space along 1 mile (1.6 km) of the Potomac River shoreline from the Francis Case Memorial Bridge to Fort McNair.

The idea of redeveloping the waterfront gained momentum with District officials in the early 2000s when the Anacostia Waterfront Corporation was created to oversee the redevelopment of the Southwest Waterfront neighborhood. The redevelopment was intended to reconnect the neglected and isolated portions of the southwest quadrant with downtown Washington, D.C., and make the area accessible and attractive to pedestrians while enhancing the existing community. Developers named the project at the suggestion of D.C. Congresswoman Eleanor Holmes Norton, who recalled that this section of neighborhood was known as The Wharf during the 19th and early 20th centuries.

== Geography ==
Selected locations near The Wharf D.C.
- Points of interest
- Parks and open spaces
- Transit
1 Municipal Fish Market
2 Transit Pier, Water Taxi Terminal
3 District Pier
4 District Square
5 Capital Yacht Club
6 Recreational Pier
7 7th Street Park
8 The Wharf Marina
9 Waterfront Metro Station

District Pier - the District Pier extends 425 feet into the Washington Channel, making it the longest pier in the city. District Pier houses the Dockmaster Building, a 2,000 square foot building with 270-degree views of the channel and waterfront.

Transit Pier - The Transit Pier provides access to water taxi services and hosts a floating stage for live music and an ice rink.

Recreation Pier - The Recreation Pier provides public access to the water as well as kayak and stand-up paddleboard rentals.

District Square - The Wharf's pedestrian mall that hosts boutiques, shops, and restaurants.

Blair Alley - A residential entrance and fountain dedicated to the memory of Blair Phillips, a young architect who worked on The Wharf project and died in a ski accident.

== History ==
Opened in 1805, the Municipal Fish Market is the longest continually operating fish market in the United States. For a time known as Maine Avenue Fish Market, it served as the inspiration for the redevelopment project. The fish market and other businesses on the waterfront were relatively prosperous throughout the 19th century, but by the early 20th century, the area was in decline. By 1945, the Southwest Waterfront had become a target for urban renewal, and the District of Columbia Redevelopment Act allowed the U.S. federal government to acquire a property using eminent domain. The federal government removed twenty-three thousand residents, primarily African Americans, from their homes and demolished a majority of the structures. The cleared land was redeveloped into housing complexes and federal office buildings and was used for the construction of highway I-395, which now runs between the waterfront and the National Mall.

== Planning and development ==
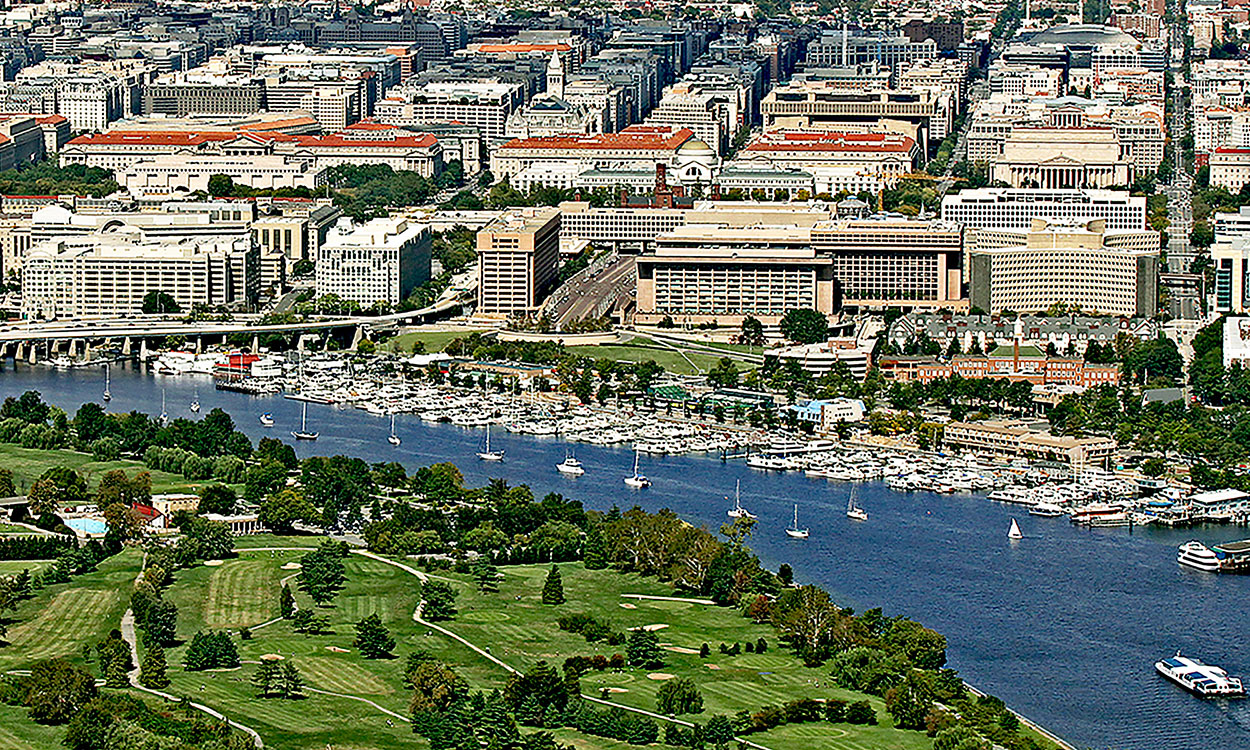
Hoffman & Associates; The Washington Channel July 2012, Before The WHARF Phase I Construction

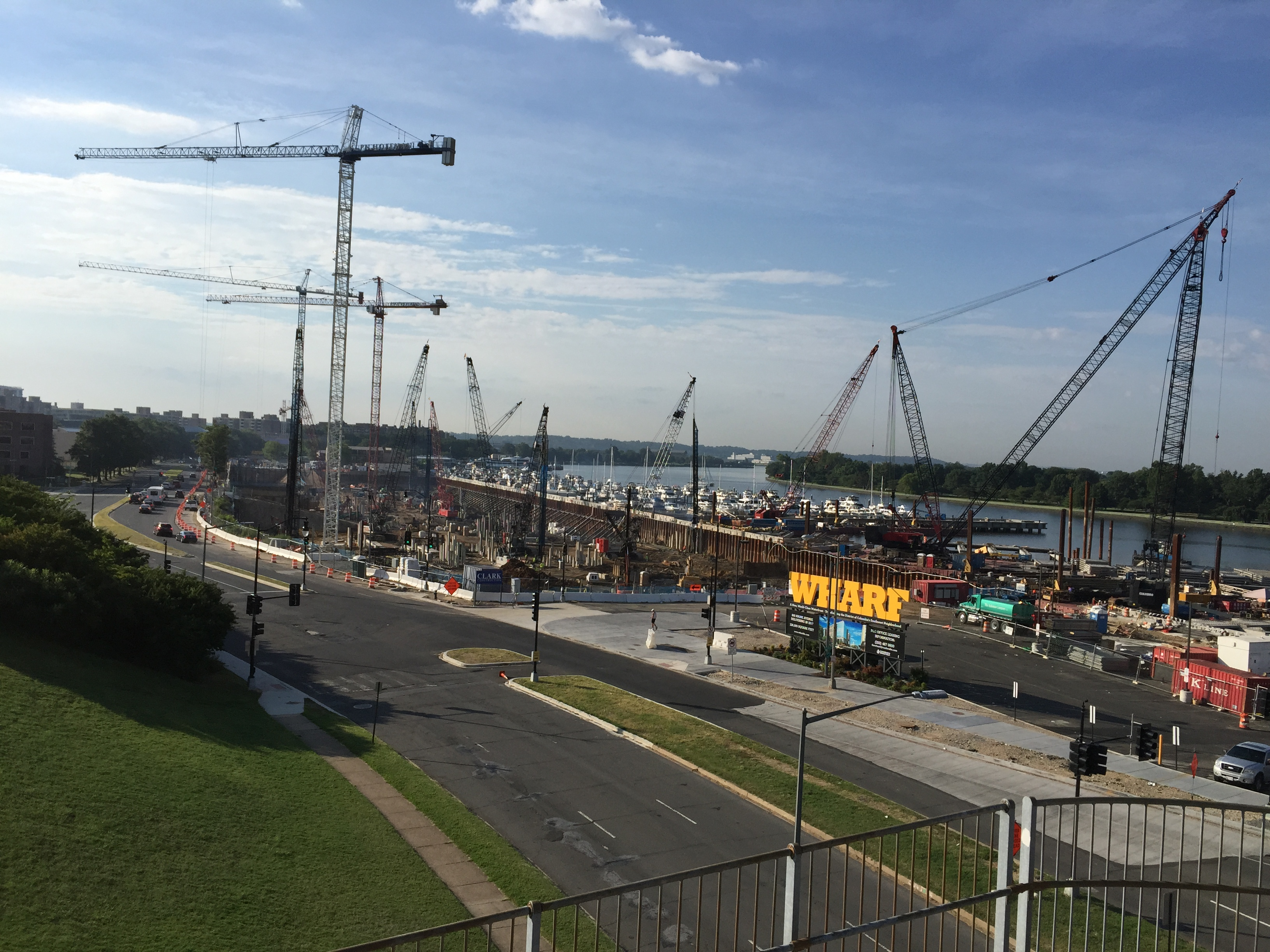
Construction of the Wharf in 2015

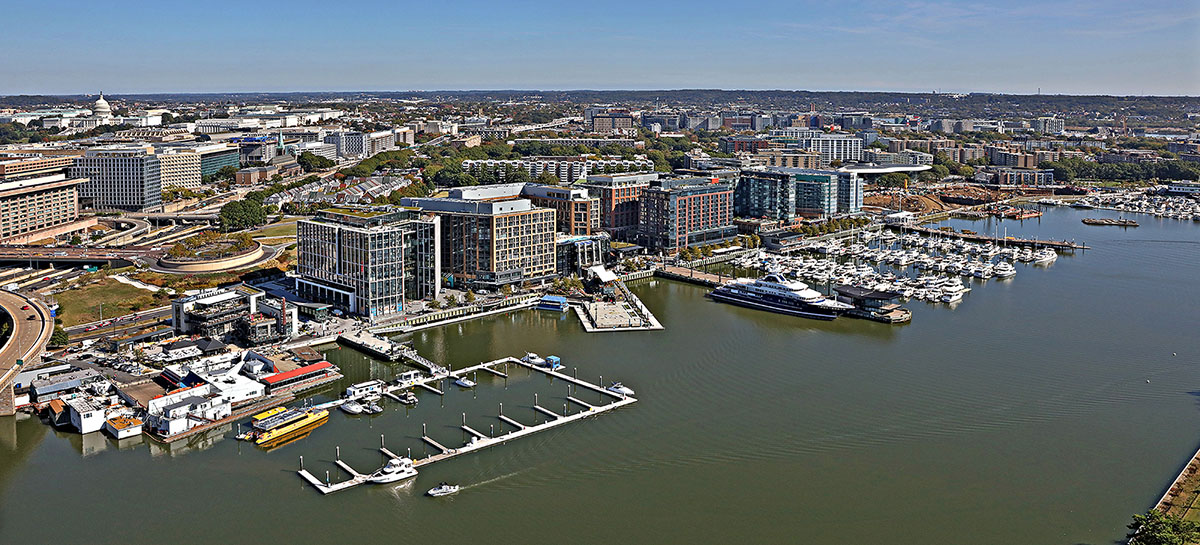

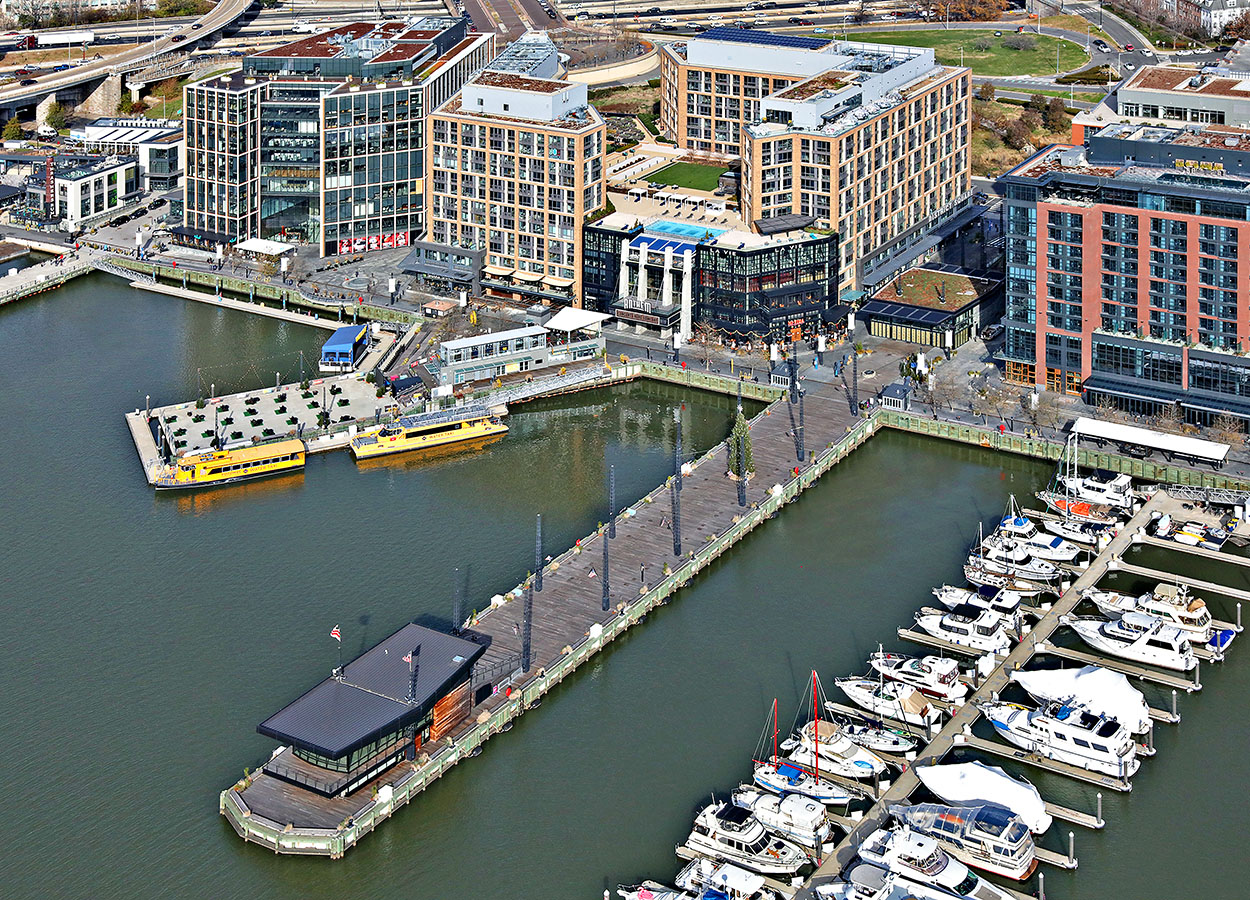
Hoffman & Associates; The WHARF Phase I, December 2020

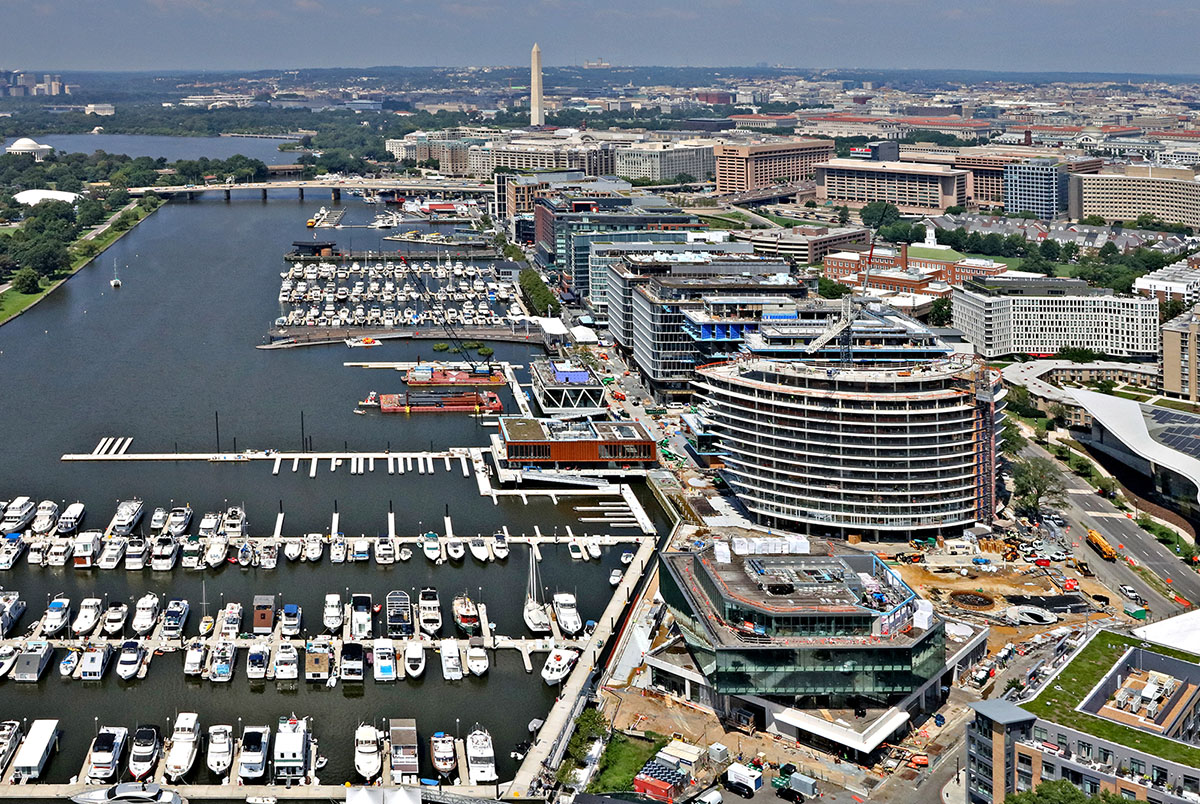

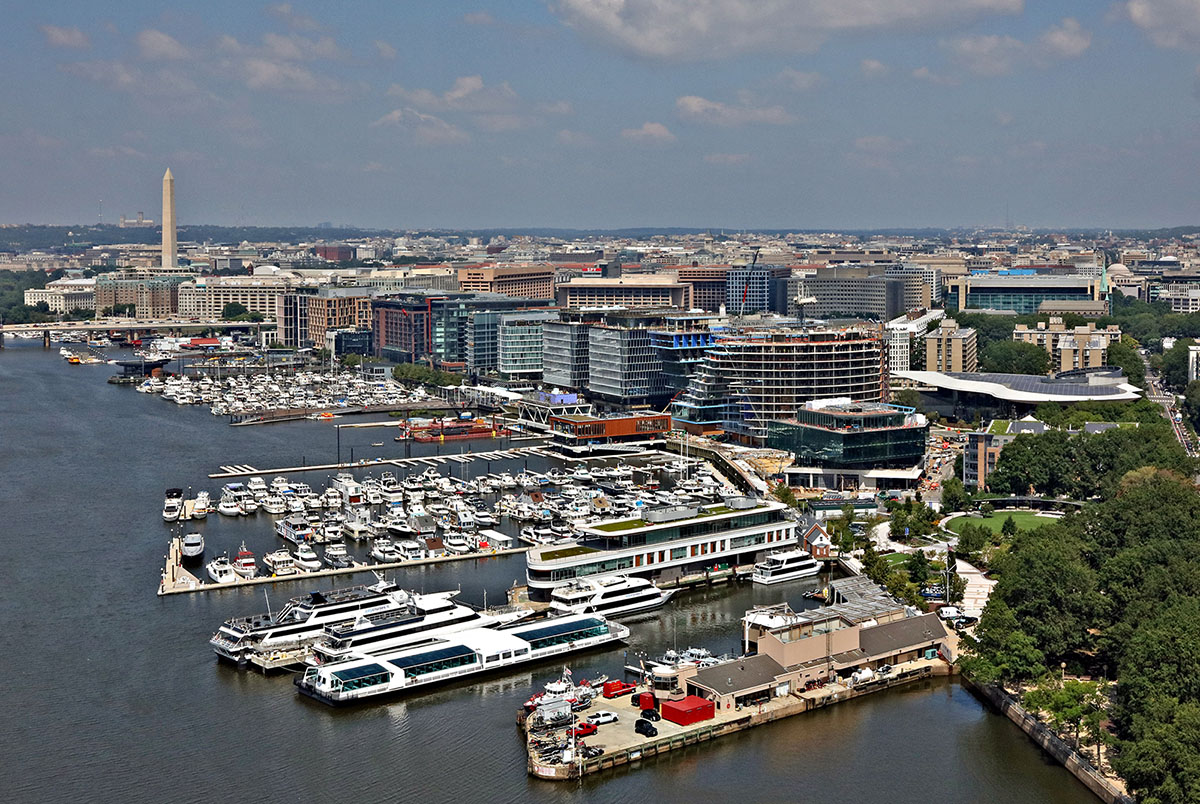

In 2003, Mayor Anthony A. Williams renewed interest in revitalizing the area. He created the Anacostia Waterfront Corporation to oversee development on the waterfront. In 2006, PN Hoffman was chosen from a field of 17 companies and tasked with reimagining the waterfront. PN Hoffman originally partnered with Struever Bros. Eccles & Rouse of Baltimore on the project, but the company was dismantled as a result of the 2008 financial crisis. By 2008, Hoffman had acquired most of the land required for the development of The Wharf. The Council of the District of Columbia had allocated $198 million in tax increment financing bonds for infrastructure improvements to support the project. In 2010, Hoffman partnered with Madison Marquette and formed Hoffman-Madison Waterfront to bring the project to fruition. U.S. Rep. Eleanor Holmes Norton introduced two bills in Congress that made the redevelopment of the waterfront possible. One bill solidified the District's ownership of the Southwest Waterfront. The other gave the District control of portions of the Washington Channel. In honor of the congresswoman's contributions, Hoffman-Madison Waterfront named the largest park in The Wharf development after Norton.

Hoffman-Madison Waterfront hired the architectural firm Perkins Eastman to serve as The Wharf's master architects. By March 2013, the D.C. Zoning Commission had approved plans for phases 1 and 2 of the project. Groundbreaking for Phase 1 occurred May 19, 2014, and The Wharf opened to the public October 12, 2017. In 2019, The Wharf (Phase 1) was awarded the Urban Land Institute Global Award for Excellence Winner.

Hoffman-Madison Waterfront broke ground on the second phase of the project in March 2019, and it opened in October 2022, culminating in a total redevelopment cost of $3.6 billion. Phase 2 added three office buildings, an apartment building, a hotel, a 96-unit condominium building, additional retail space, and two new underground parking garages.

== Entertainment and activities ==
The Wharf features multiple live music venues, including The Anthem, a 6,000-seat concert hall, as well as the club venues Union Stage and Pearl Street Warehouse. The waterfront also features year-round street performers and musical acts that perform on a floating barge stage. The Wharf is home to the Capital Yacht Club and some day-docks and live-aboard slips. Water taxi service connects The Wharf to Georgetown, Alexandria, Virginia, and the National Harbor in Oxon Hill, MD. Visitors may also take guided boat tours to view Washington attractions and monuments from the Potomac River. The Wharf operates a free jitney service that shuttles passengers from the Recreation Pier across the Washington Channel to East Potomac Park. Kayak and stand-up paddleboard rentals are also available seasonally.

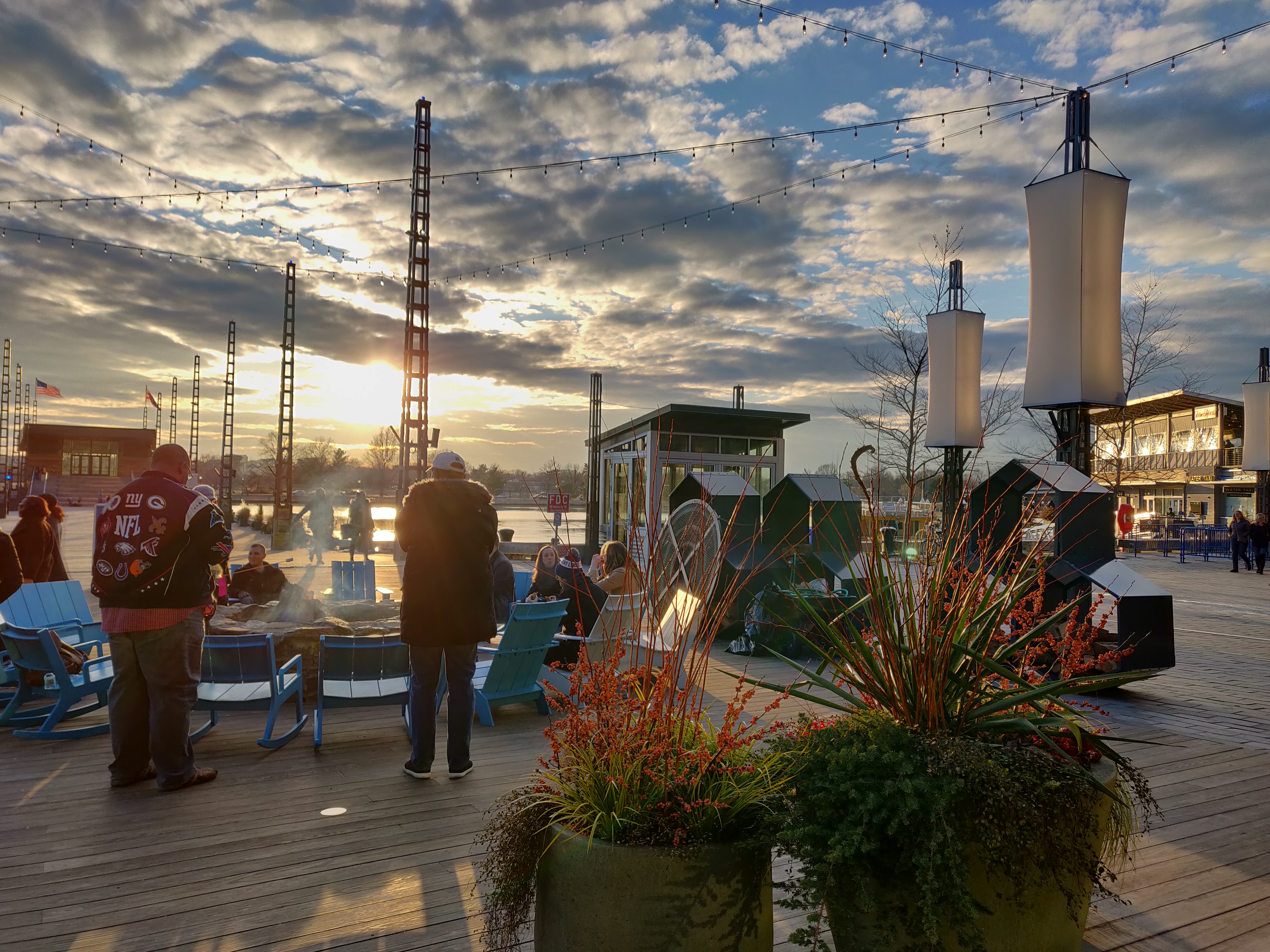
The fire pit at the Wharf

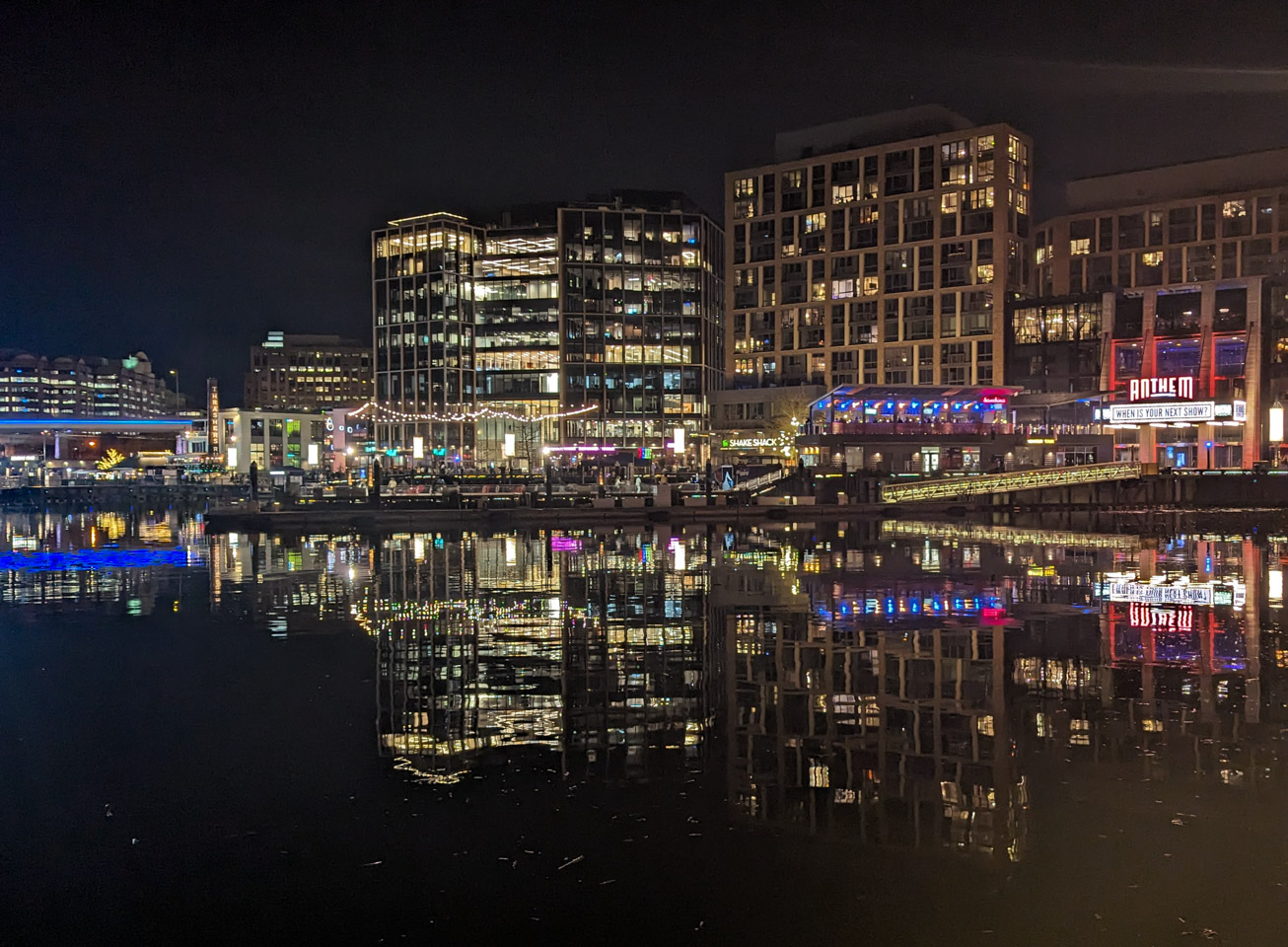
The Wharf at night

A wood-burning fire pit is located along the waterfront at District Square. A retrofitted camper known as Camp Wharf offers supplies for s’mores, including marshmallows, chocolate, graham crackers, and sticks for roasting.

The Wharf is accessible by car, with underground parking available. A two-way cycle track runs the length of The Wharf, and the curbside is entirely reserved for rideshare and parcel pick-up and drop-off. Public transportation options include water taxis, metro, multiple Capital Bikeshare stations, and a free community shuttle. The shuttle stops at L'Enfant Plaza station on the Washington Metro, the International Spy Museum, and the National Mall adjacent to the Hirshhorn Museum and Sculpture Garden. The walk from L'Enfant Metro to the Wharf is less than ten minutes, with a pedestrian walkway along L'Enfant Plaza.

== See also ==
- Architecture of Washington, D.C.
- Culture of Washington, D.C.
