= Maine Avenue Fish Market =

Open-air market in Washington, D.C.

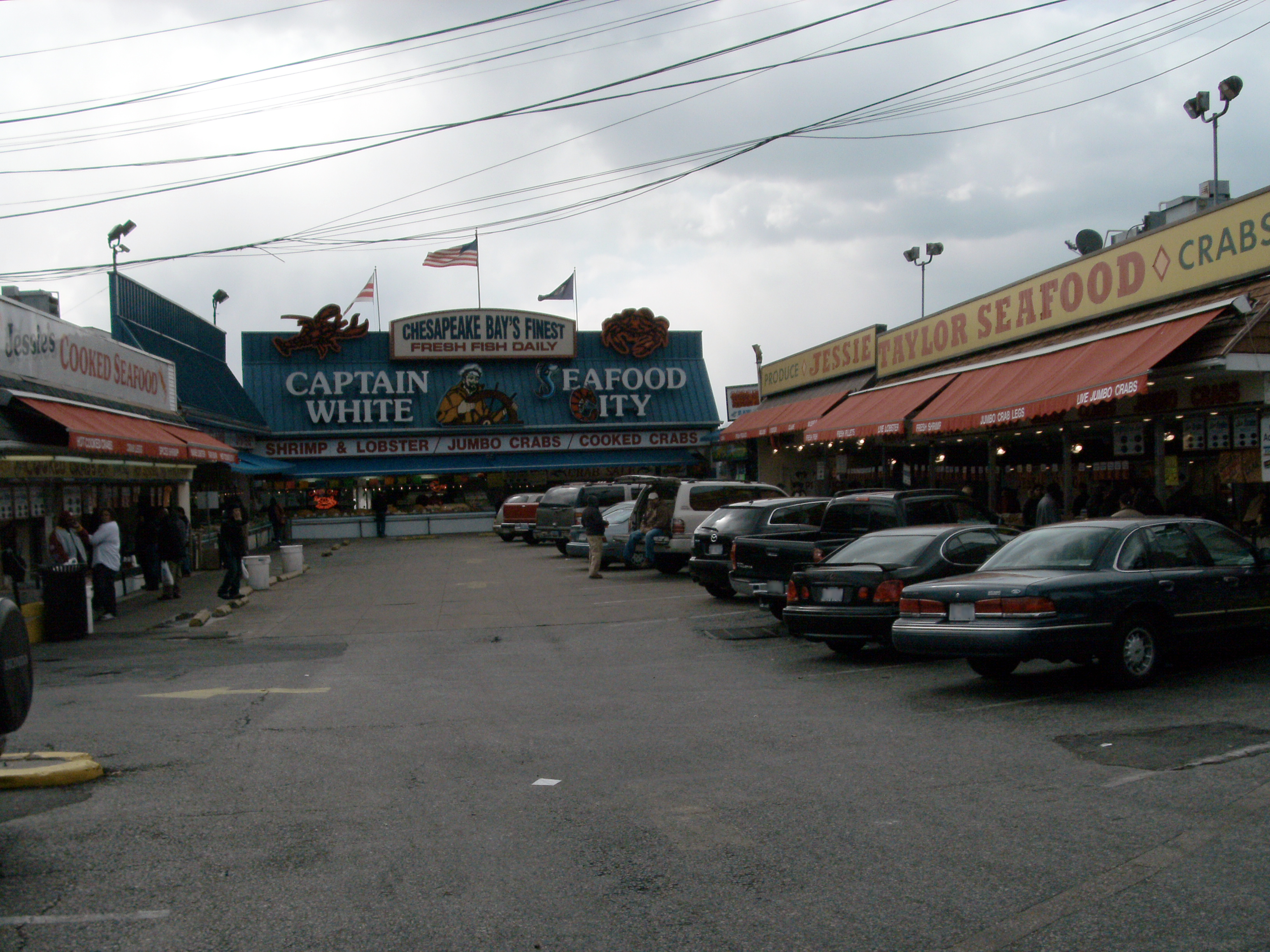
- The Maine Avenue Fish Market in February 2009
- Type: Fish Market
- Location: Washington, D.C.
- Coordinates: 38°52′53″N 77°01′40″W

History
- Opening date: 1805

The Maine Avenue Fish Market, also known as the Municipal Fish Market, the Fish Wharf, or simply, the Wharf, is an open-air seafood market in Southwest Washington, D.C., a local landmark and one of the few that remain on the east coast of the United States. Opened in 1805, it is the oldest continuously operating fish market in the United States, founded 17 years earlier than New York City's Fulton Fish Market.

== Overview ==
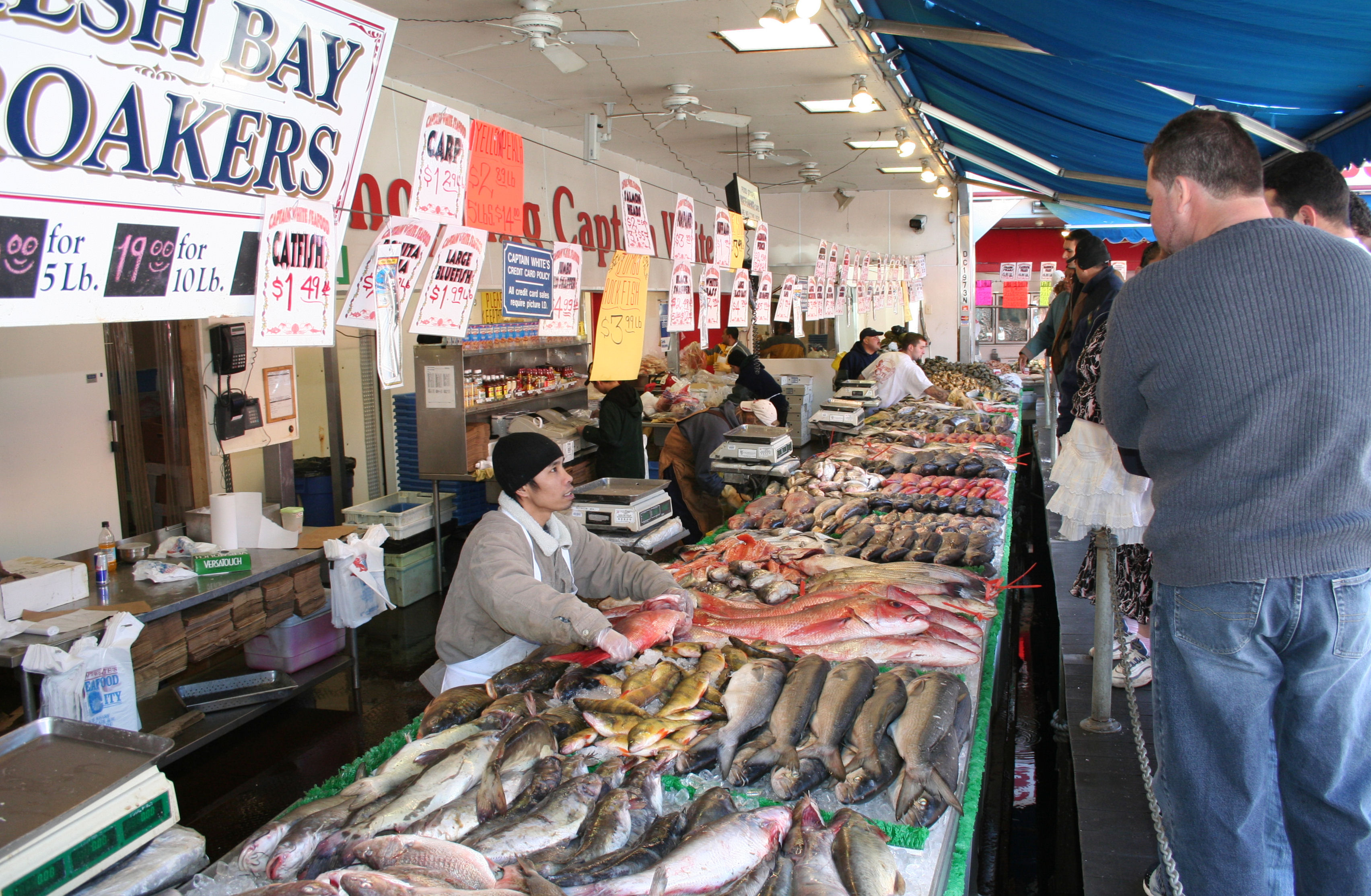
Fresh seafood is laid out for customers on one of several floating barge vendors, as it appeared in March 2006.

Located on the Southwest Waterfront of Washington, D.C., in the shadow of Interstate 395, the Maine Avenue Fish Market stands as a cultural relic popular with locals and little known to tourists who flock to the monuments and museums just five blocks north. There are more than ten stores, each with a specialty. The Maine Avenue Fish Market is open throughout the week, with the largest selection of fish on display Friday evening through Sunday.

A multitude of fresh seafood is sold on floating barges that line the pier along Water Street. These barges, which rise and fall with the tide, are a tribute to an old tradition dating back to the Civil War. For years, fishmongers would navigate once a week down the Potomac to the Chesapeake. There, they would purchase seafood from the watermen and head back to the Washington, D.C., wharf. In 1961, refrigerated trucks became more efficient to bring the catch from the Eastern Shore and the "buy boats" were permanently docked and later replaced by today's steel barges.

== History ==
=== 19th century ===
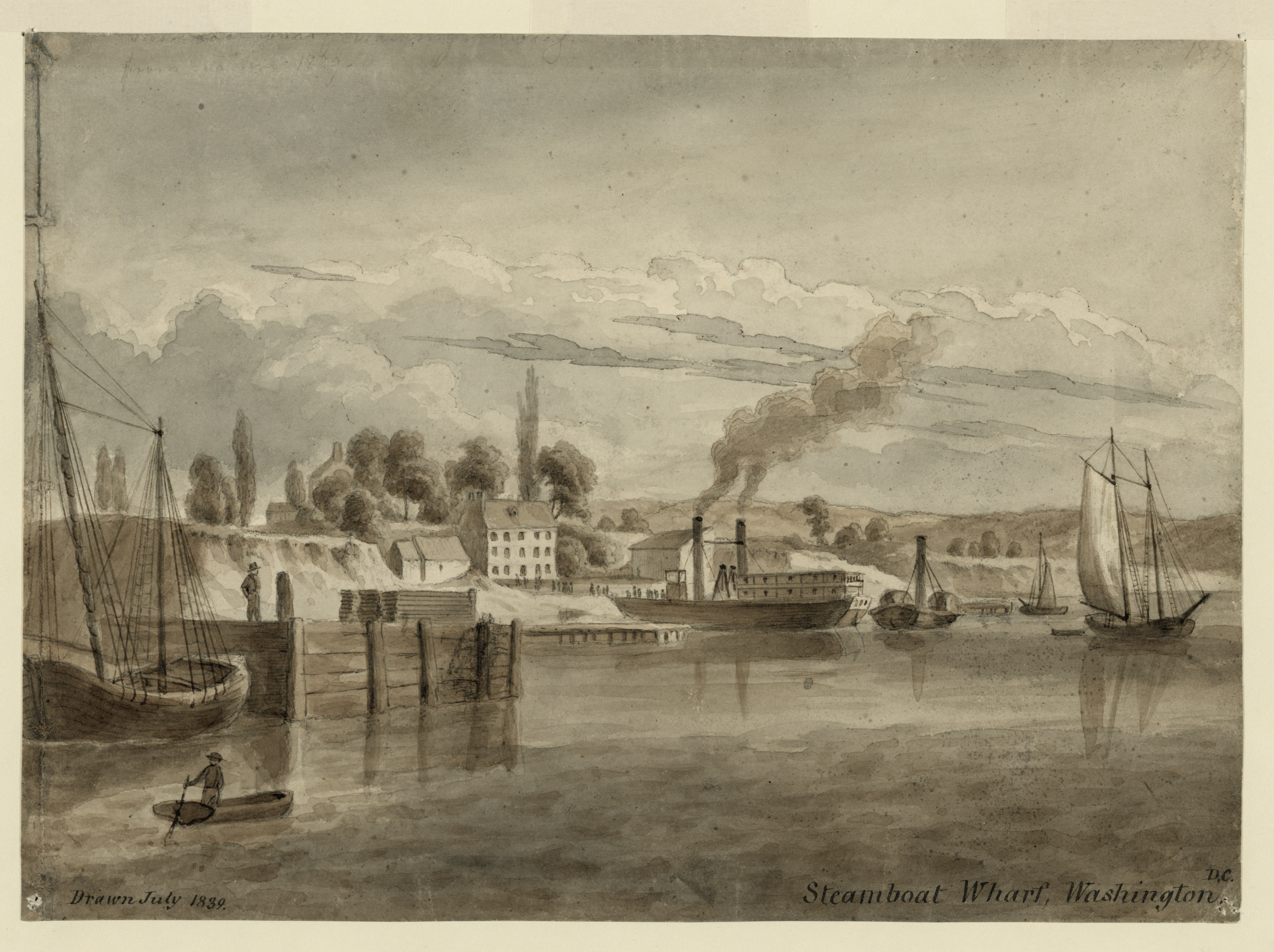
The Steamboat Wharf in 1839

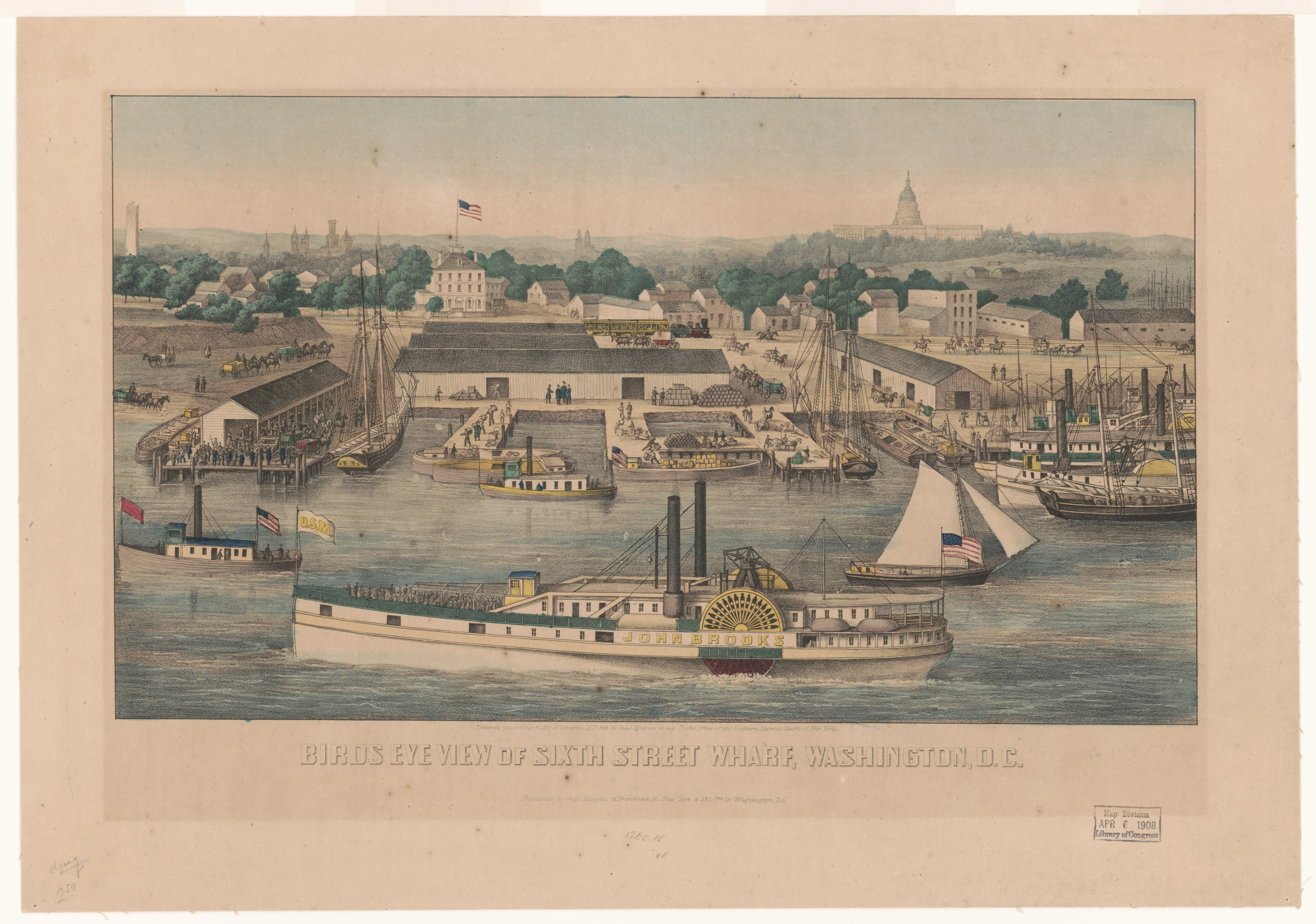
Bird's eye view of the 6th Street SW wharf and the fish market in 1863

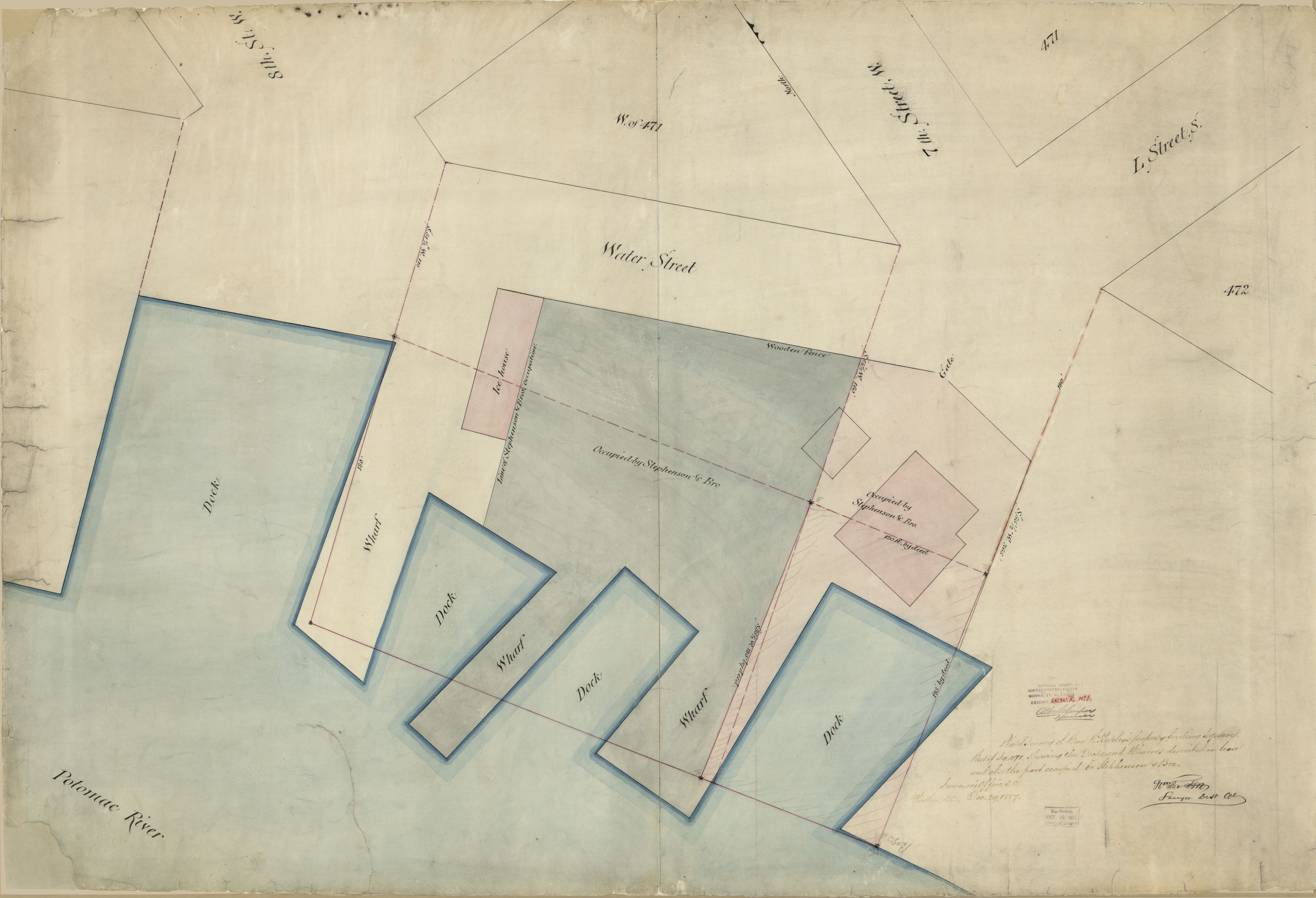
Survey of the wharves at the corner of 7th Street SW and L Street SW

The Washington wharf has hosted a fish market since the 1790s, when fisherman sold their catch directly off their boats. The Maine Avenue Fish Market has been in continuous operation since 1805, making it the oldest operating fish market in the United States and 17 years older than New York City's Fulton Fish Market, which was moved to the Bronx in 2005. The Maine Avenue Market was moved a few blocks along the Washington Channel in the 1960s.

On March 19, 1823, by Ordinance of the Corporation of the City of Washington established the following sites are established as "fishdocks":

- The south extremity of Seventh-street west, on the Tiber.
- The wharfs owned or occupied by Joseph Ratcliff and Samuel Smoot, on Twenty-eight street, on Rock-Creek, near the lower Bridge
- The landings on the north-side of Tiber, at 7th and 12th streets [near the market] : provided that no fish shall be cleaned on the said landings
- The Steam-boat wharf on the Potomac, near the bridge over the Potomoc; and at Cana's wharf
- The south extremity of New-Jersey Avenue

The wharf on the Potomac was located at the end of M Street SW. At the time, the corner of 7th Street SW and M Street SW did not exist. Until 1880, no revenue was paid to the city for the fish wharf until W.A. Wimsatt & Co. leased it from the city government. The wharf moved just north to where 11th Street SW lands on the river with rents paid annually in February.

Several species of fish were sold at the market. By 1900, a lot of shad was sold at the Washington fish wharf, while herrings were mainly sold at the Alexandria wharf, across the river.

=== Municipal Fish Market ===
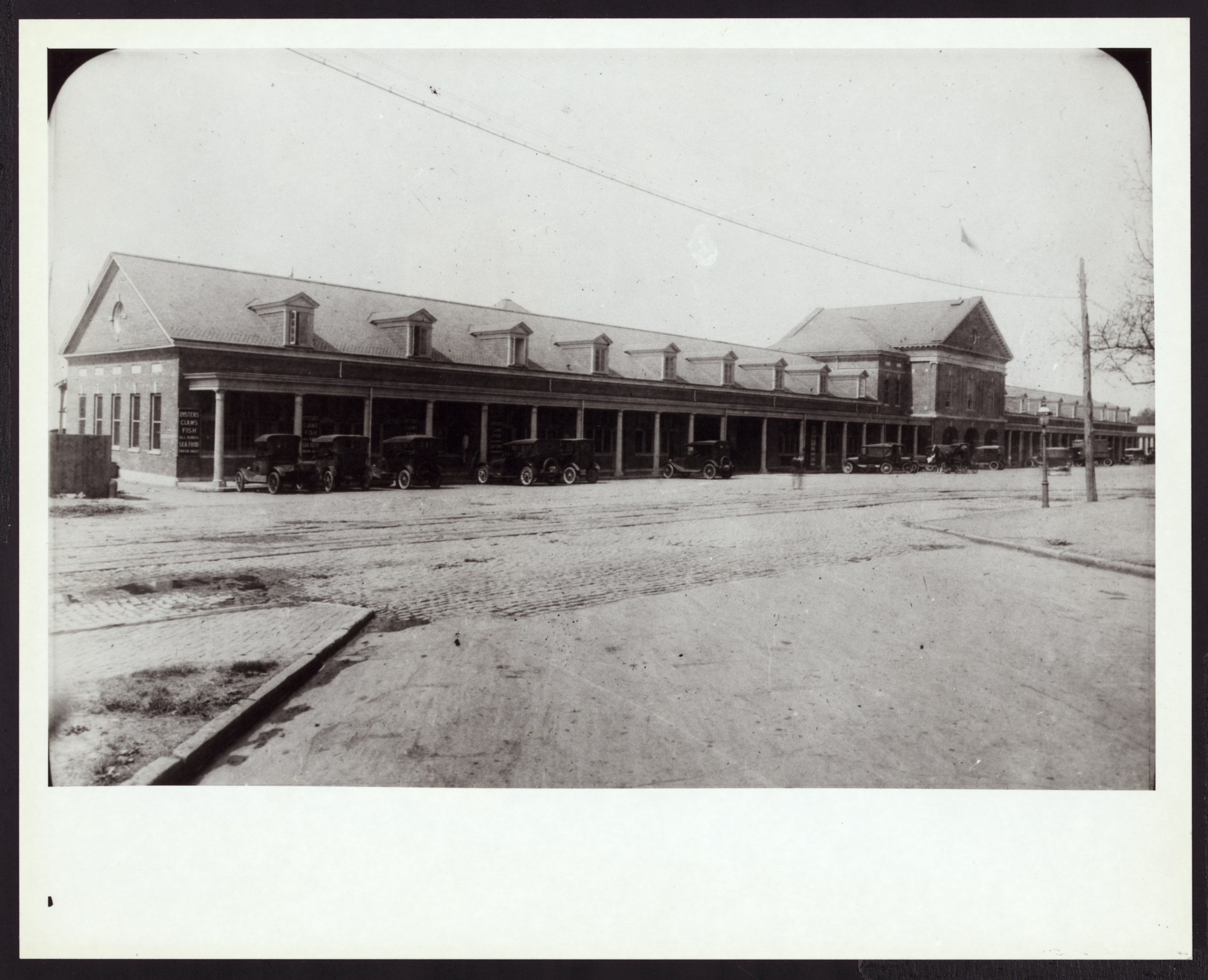
Eastern side of the Municipal Fish Market in 1915.

The Riley family had owned the wharf since about 1803. T.W. Riley had been involved in its operation for close to 80 years when he died aged 93 in 1912. The wharf was leased to W.W. Riley, T.W.'s son, until March 15, 1908, when the lease was not renewed. Litigation ended on March 15, 1913.

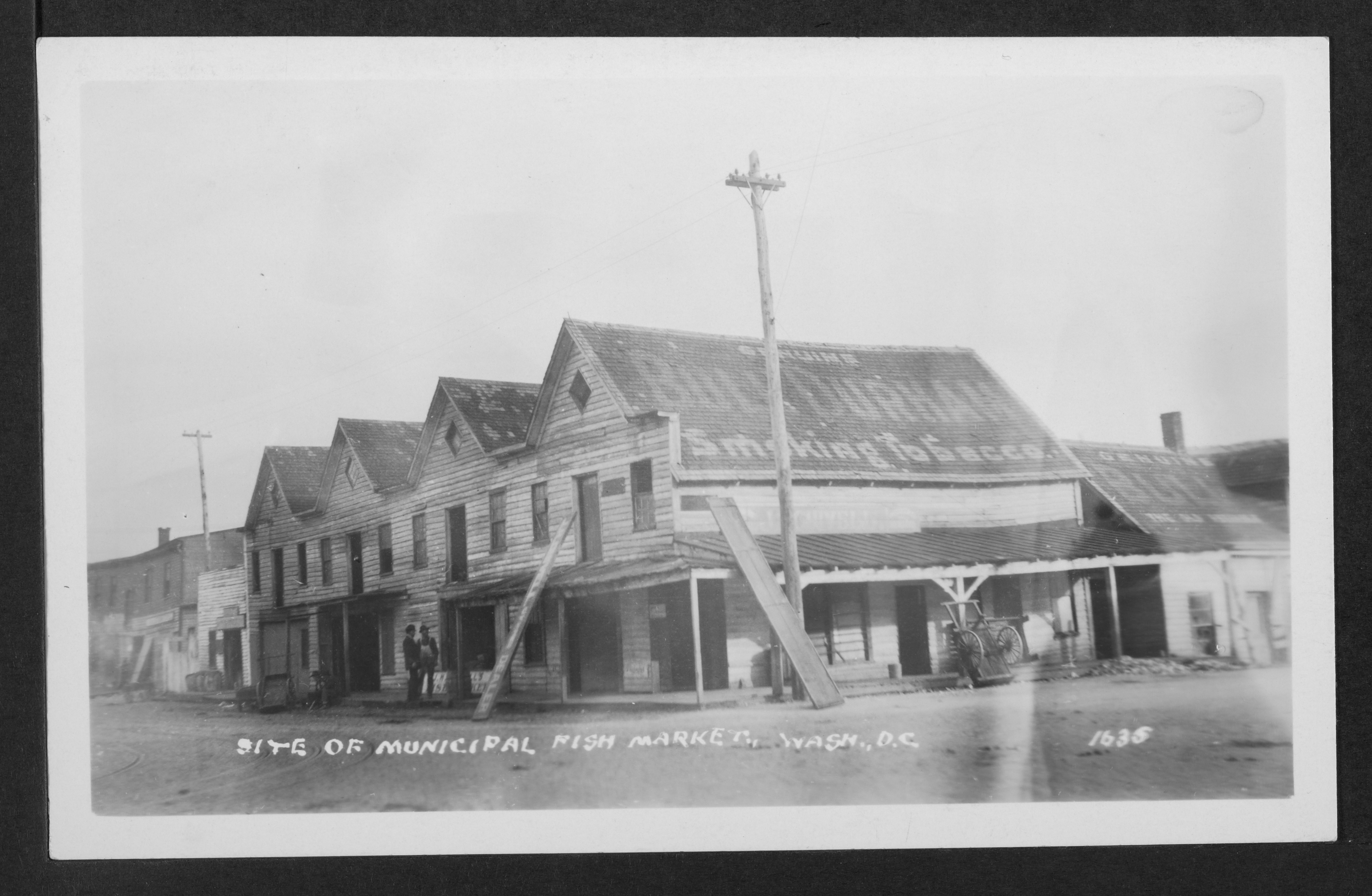
View of fish market at intersection of Water St, 11th St, and G St, 1917

Meanwhile, sanitation concerns and the smell emanating from the fish wharf drew the public to request the building of a municipal fish market managed by the city. Congress looked into the matter in 1912 for the 1914 budget. The District Commissioners recommended the creation of a new office of marketmaster and wharfinger, which would be in charge of wharfage, dockage rentals, rents for fish houses and a proposed fish wharf and market. They sought authorization to take over and operate the water front on the Potomac on Water Street SW between 11th Street SW and 12th Street SW. On March 15, 1913, the Fish Wharf was placed under the control of Col. W.C. Haskell, Superintendent of Weights, Measures and Markets of the District. Wharfage fees remain the same.

At the time, the three wharves were used for:

- Oysters and melons
- Fish
- Lumber

On July 12, 1913, the retail of melons at the wharf was banned by the District Commissioners.

In addition, fish were sold in 17 shacks facing Water Street SW between 11th Street SW and 12th Street SWe. A plan for the New Market called for a main building to be built along Water Street SW with wings extending along the wharves. The cost was estimated at $98,000 for the building with an additional $25,000 for the smoking and packing houses. An addition $10,000 would be needed to improve the surroundings.

However, the funds were not approved in 1913 in the District appropriation bill in spite of all the dealers being ready for a new building and having made application for the new quarters. By that time, the existing buildings had been in use for close to 40 years. No proper sewerage existed and all the water run-offs went in the ground under the buildings.

Finally, on July 21, 1914, the District appropriation bill created the post of Market master and wharfinger and approved $50,000 to rebuild the wharves and prepare plans. On March 3, 1915, $125,000 was appropriated to build the buildings on the site of the municipal fish wharf and market, including refrigeration and cold-storage plants to accommodate retail and wholesale. The total amount to be spent was fixed at $185,000.

The building was designed by Municipal Architect Snowden Ashford and built at a cost of $150,000 with an additional $50,000 spent on the three concrete wharves. The building opened in the spring of 1918.

=== The move ===
On August 7, 1958, the House District Committee approved the demolition of the Municipal Fish Market and the nearby Farmers' Market to make way for the Southwest Waterfront Renewal Project. The bill passed the full council soon after. Thirteen restaurants and seafood dealers occupied the building at the time. The two-story brick Municipal Fish Market was scheduled to be razed and the occupants told to leave by November 1, 1959.

Instead, the vendors refused to leave, citing a clause in their leases allowing them to stay for 99 years. The deadline for moving was pushed to January 1, 1960, and then put on hold while proposals to move the seafood dealers were debated. However, a Municipal Court ruling decided on January 22, 1960, that the District was not required to move the dealers before evicting them. The building was closed on February 1, 1960, and its demolition slated to start on March 1, 1960. The fishing boats remained on site, their future uncertain. After several years of negotiations and planning, decks and a marina along with several buildings were announced, but the displaced businesses had no new home in 1965.

Ultimately, the current Municipal Pier was built for the market under the I-395 12th Street highway offramp. Vendors occupy new floating barges. In 1987, the wharfage fee was $105 per month.

The Fish Market has been praised by urban planners as an example of the sort of small-scale, integrated streetscape that has been displaced by large-scale urban redevelopment in much of the Washington, D.C., area. However, the Market is somewhat isolated from the Mall due to its location under the freeway, and the city has refrained from promoting it as an attraction due to uncertainty about whether it can be preserved.

=== 21st-century redevelopment ===
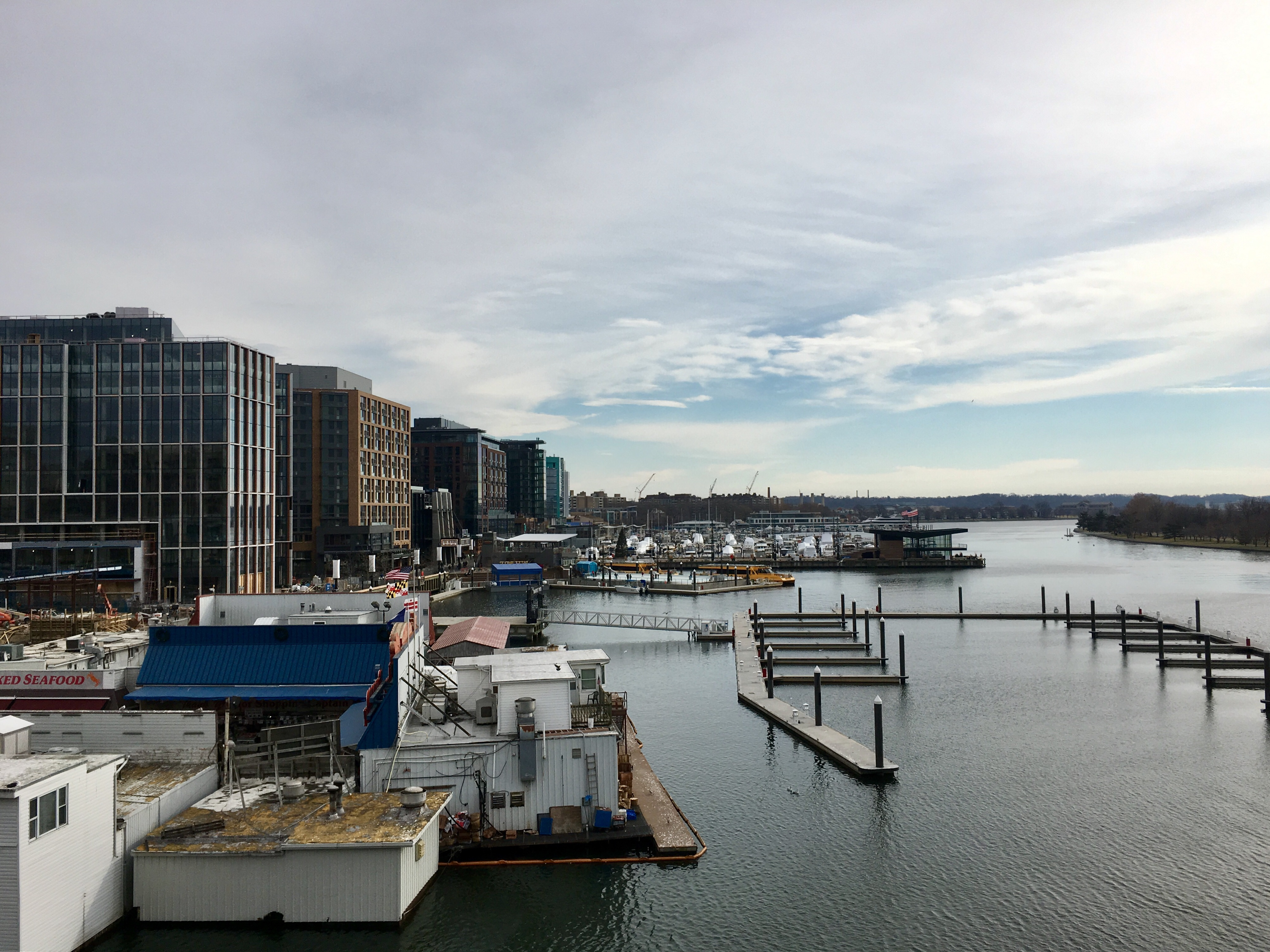
The area around the fish market (left foreground) has been heavily redeveloped into residential, shopping, and entertainment areas.

By 2009, plans were underway to once again redevelop Maine Avenue and remove the frontage road of Water Street, where the waterfront buildings and wharf were located. Some support structures on Water Street, including the sole remaining land-based eatery, were scheduled to be razed ”to keep the Fish Market in safe and operable condition until the redevelopment occurs”, said an official with the Office of the Deputy Mayor for Planning and Economic Development. A website associated with the developer PN Hoffman said, "Washington’s historic Fish Market will be preserved and renovated and the maritime heritage of the site promoted."

District Wharf complex opened with Phase I in October 2017, including residential space, hotels, live music venues, shops and restaurants, many overlooking the redesigned wharves and marina. Water Street SW was converted to pedestrian use. Phase II of the redevelopment commenced in mid-2018 and was completed in October 2022.

On November 4, 2021, two of the three barges operated by Captain White, one of the largest seafood vendors at the Market, were "detached from the pier and towed by boat down the Potomac River," Washingtonian magazine reported. The third barge is to leave as well in December, and the business reestablished elsewhere. “You’re going to have to ask the developers next door why,” co-owner Pete White said.

== In popular culture ==
- The Maine Avenue Fish Market is featured in the 2009 film, State of Play.
