= Capital Yacht Club =

Yacht club in Washington, D.C., United States

- Burgee
- Short name: CYC
- Founded: 1892
- Location: 800 Wharf Street, SW, Washington, DC
- Website: www.capitalyachtclub.com

The Capital Yacht Club is a yacht club located in The Wharf in Washington, D.C., United States.
