= Southwest Waterfront =

Neighborhood in Washington, D.C., United States

Coordinates: 38.8812°N 77.0164°W

- Map of Washington, D.C., with Southwest Waterfront highlighted in maroon.
- Country: United States
- District: Washington, D.C.
- Ward: Ward 6

Government
  - Councilmember: Charles Allen

The Southwest Waterfront is a neighborhood in Southwest Washington, D.C. The Southwest quadrant is the smallest of Washington's four quadrants, and the Southwest Waterfront is one of only two residential neighborhoods in the quadrant; the other is Bellevue, which, being east of the Anacostia River, is frequently, if mistakenly, regarded as being in Southeast.

Southwest Waterfront is bounded by Interstate 395 to the north, Washington Channel to the west, the Anacostia River to the south, and South Capitol Street to the east. Politically, Southwest Waterfront lies in Ward 6. It contains The Wharf mixed-use district.

== History ==
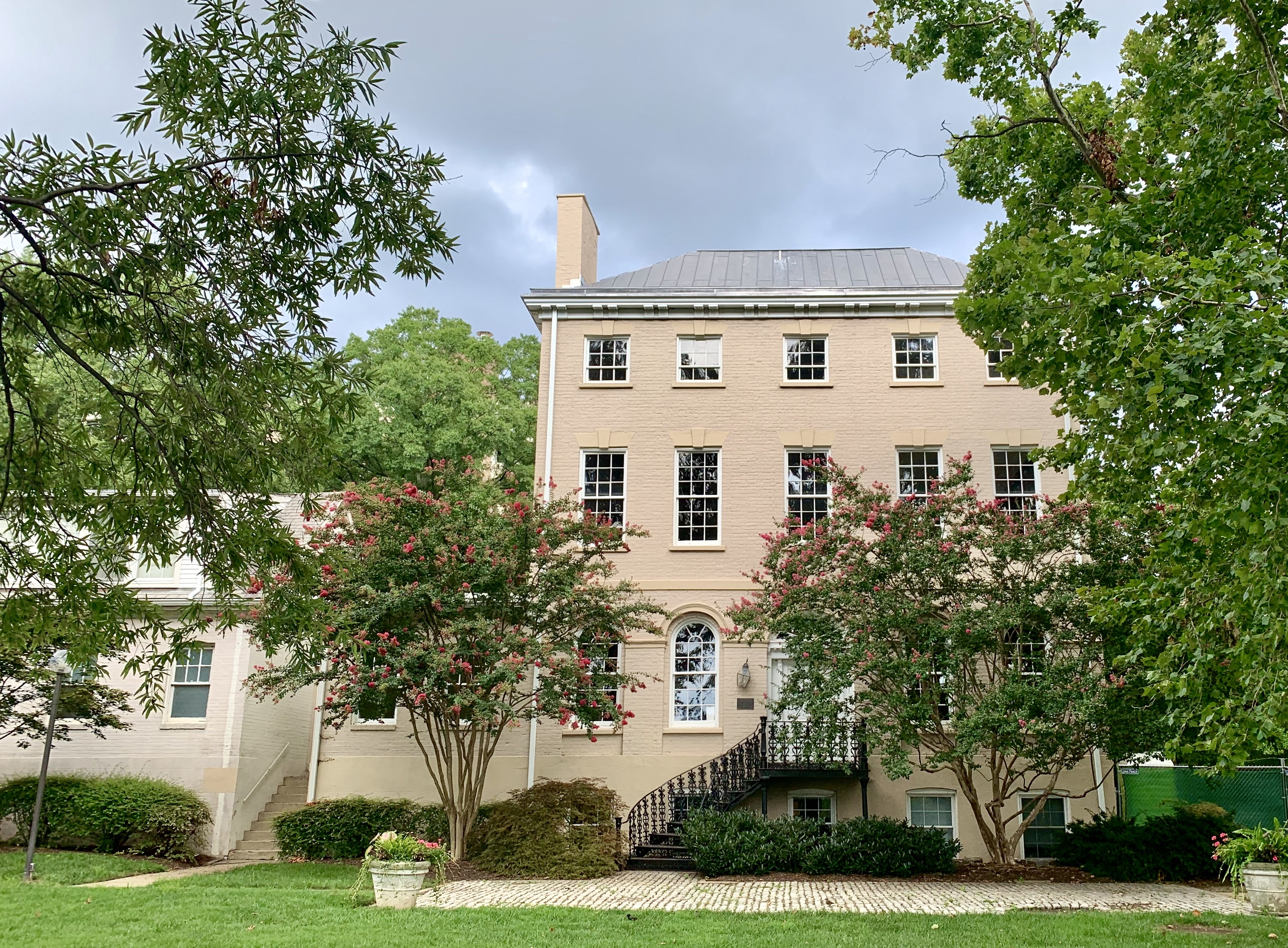
The Thomas Law House built in 1796

Southwest Waterfront is part of Pierre L'Enfant's original city plans. It includes some of the oldest buildings in the city, including the Wheat Row block of townhouses, built in 1793, the Thomas Law House, built in 1796, and Fort McNair, which was established in 1791 as "the U.S. Arsenal at Greenleaf Point."

Before the federal government's survey and appropriation of the District of Columbia, most of what is now Southwest Waterfront was part of a large slave plantation owned by Notley Young. After the city was established, much of the former Young plantation was purchased by a Bostonian venture capitalist named James Greenleaf, who received a discount on sixty thousand real estate lots in exchange for a promise to build ten new houses on them per year. Greenleaf, however, had not secured the financial backing he had claimed and was unable to finance the promised construction. (He declared bankruptcy in 1797.) As a result, except for a few scattered buildings such as Thomas Law's (a land speculator who was able to put down pounds sterling) and workers' shanties, settlement of the Southwest Waterfront was extremely slow. Despite his crippling of the region's growth, Greenleaf's name was eventually given to the section of land along the bank of the river on which the Arsenal stood.

Law himself was the other prominent figure in defining the early character of the Southwest Waterfront. He built its first industrial outpost, a sugar refinery, in 1797. He also initiated the construction in 1802 of the Washington City Canal, which connected Tiber Creek, at the western foot of the National Mall, with the Anacostia River—then called the "Eastern Branch"—just east of the Arsenal. The canal opened in 1815 but was too shallow and subject to unstable tides to be useful as the industrial pipeline Law had hoped for; instead, it quickly filled with trash and stagnant water, isolating the Southwest from the rest of the city.

As a result of Law's canal, the Southwest Waterfront neighborhood was known as The Island. It was further cut off from the city when railroad tracks were built along Maryland Avenue SW. It was known primarily for its brothels, its crime, and its filthy, decrepit alley slums, and was regarded as among the worst neighborhoods in Washington.

After the Civil War, with the Canal covered, the Southwest Waterfront became more organized. However, it remained a neighborhood for the poorer classes of Washingtonians. The neighborhood was divided in half by Fourth Street SW—then known as 4 1/2 Street— with Scottish, Irish, German, and eastern European immigrants to the west and Blacks to the east. Each half was centered on religious establishments: St. Dominic's Catholic Church and Temple Beth Israel on the west and Friendship Baptist Church on the east. Each half of the neighborhood was the childhood residence of a future American musical star; Al Jolson lived on 4 1/2 Street and Marvin Gaye was born in a tenement on First Street.)

The Waterfront developed a thriving commercial district with grocery stores, shops, a movie theater, as well as a few large and elaborate houses—mostly owned by wealthy blacks— but most of the neighborhood was a very poor shantytown of tenements, shacks, and even tents. The latter were frequent subjects of photographs published with captions like, "The Washington that tourists never see."

It was also a major traffic hub from Virginia. The Long Bridge connected horse, stagecoach, and foot traffic from Alexandria to Maryland Avenue SW before becoming a railway bridge during the American Civil War. It was also the access point to the Capital for steamboat lines. The following lines operated from there in 1903: the Washington & Potomac Steamboat Company, the Maryland, Delaware & Virginia B.Y. Company and the Norfolk & Washington Steamboat Company.

== Urban renewal ==
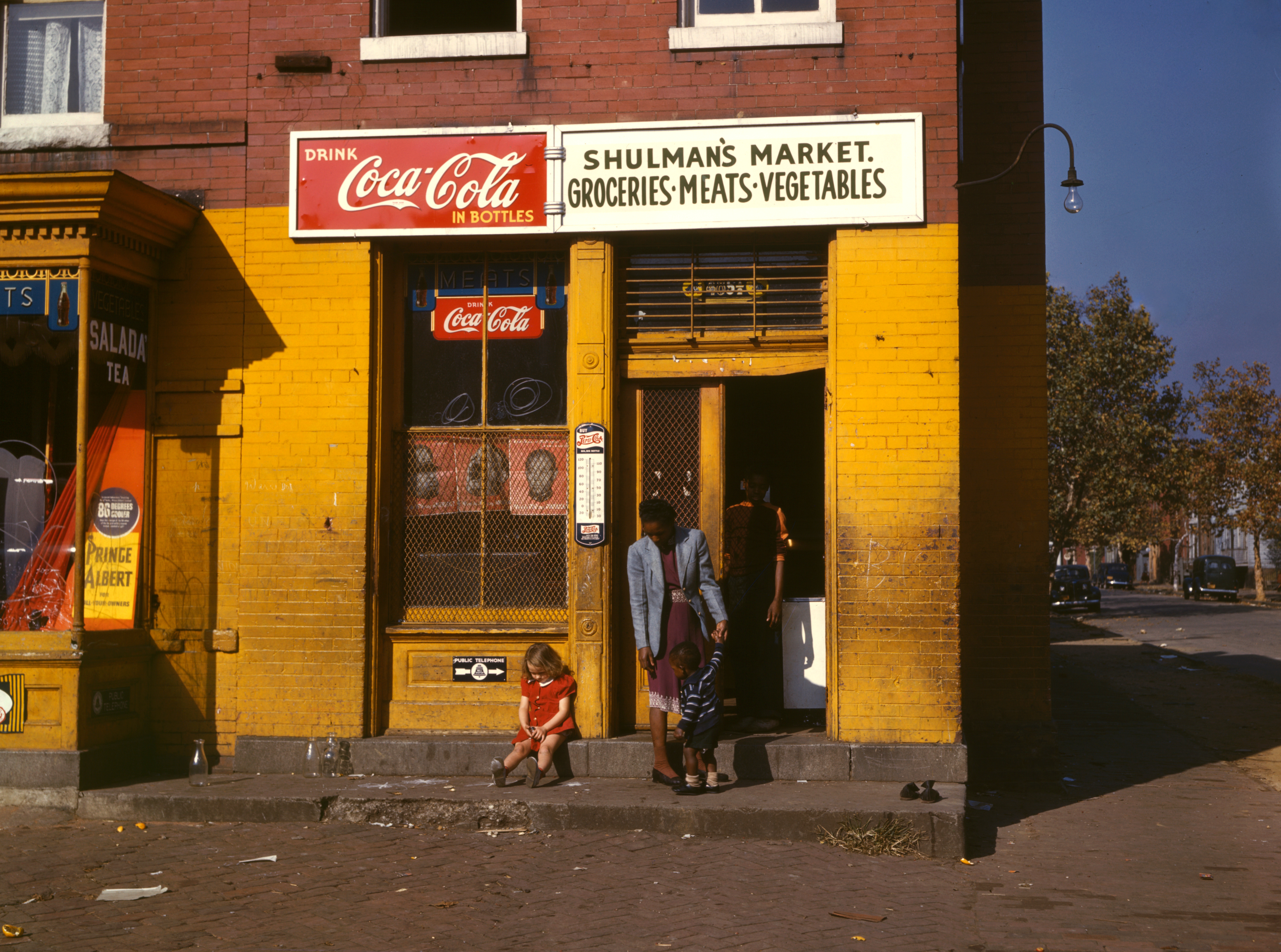
Shulman's Market (ca. 1942), one of many Jewish-owned businesses that once operated in Southwest Waterfront. This was a DGS Store.

In the 1950s, city planners working with the Congress decided that the entire Southwest quadrant should undergo significant urban renewal — in this case, the city would acquire nearly all land south of the National Mall (except Bolling Air Force Base and Fort McNair), either through voluntary purchases or through the use of eminent domain, evict virtually all of its residents and businesses, destroy many of its streets and all of its buildings and landscapes, and start again from scratch.

There was some opposition to the plan, notably from the Southwest Civic Association, because of its emphasis on building luxury housing rather than supplying low and moderate-income dwellings to replace the homes slated for demolition. John Ihlder, the director of the Alley Dwelling Authority, also spoke out about the plan's failure to provide enough affordable and public housing. However, the redevelopment plans, which had been crafted by architects Louis Justement and Chloethiel Woodward Smith and included modernist buildings, ample green spaces, and plenty of parking, were popular among many city residents and officials, and their appeal eventually won out. Only a few buildings were left intact, notably the Maine Avenue Fish Market, the Wheat Row townhouses, the Thomas Law House, and the St. Dominic's and Friendship churches. The Southeast/Southwest Freeway section of Interstate 395 was constructed where F Street, SW, separated the quadrant's business district from the residential Waterfront neighborhood.

The heart of the urban renewal of the Southwest Waterfront was Waterside Mall, a small shopping center/office complex mostly occupied by a Safeway grocery store and satellite offices for the United States Environmental Protection Agency. The Arena Stage was built a block west of the Mall, and a number of hotels and restaurants were built on the riverfront to attract tourists. The now closed Southeastern University, a very small college that had been chartered in 1937, also established itself as an important institution in the area. The residential aspect of the project began with a large apartment complex and park called Potomac Place, located on 4th Street between G and I Streets. When Nikita Khrushchev visited Washington in 1959, he pointed out to President Dwight D. Eisenhower the substandard dwellings that stood on the way from Bolling Air Force Base (where Khrushchev had arrived in the city) to the downtown area; Eisenhower, in response, ordered their driver to pass by Potomac Place to show the Soviet Premier that the nation's capital was working to assist its more impoverished citizens.

== Present day ==
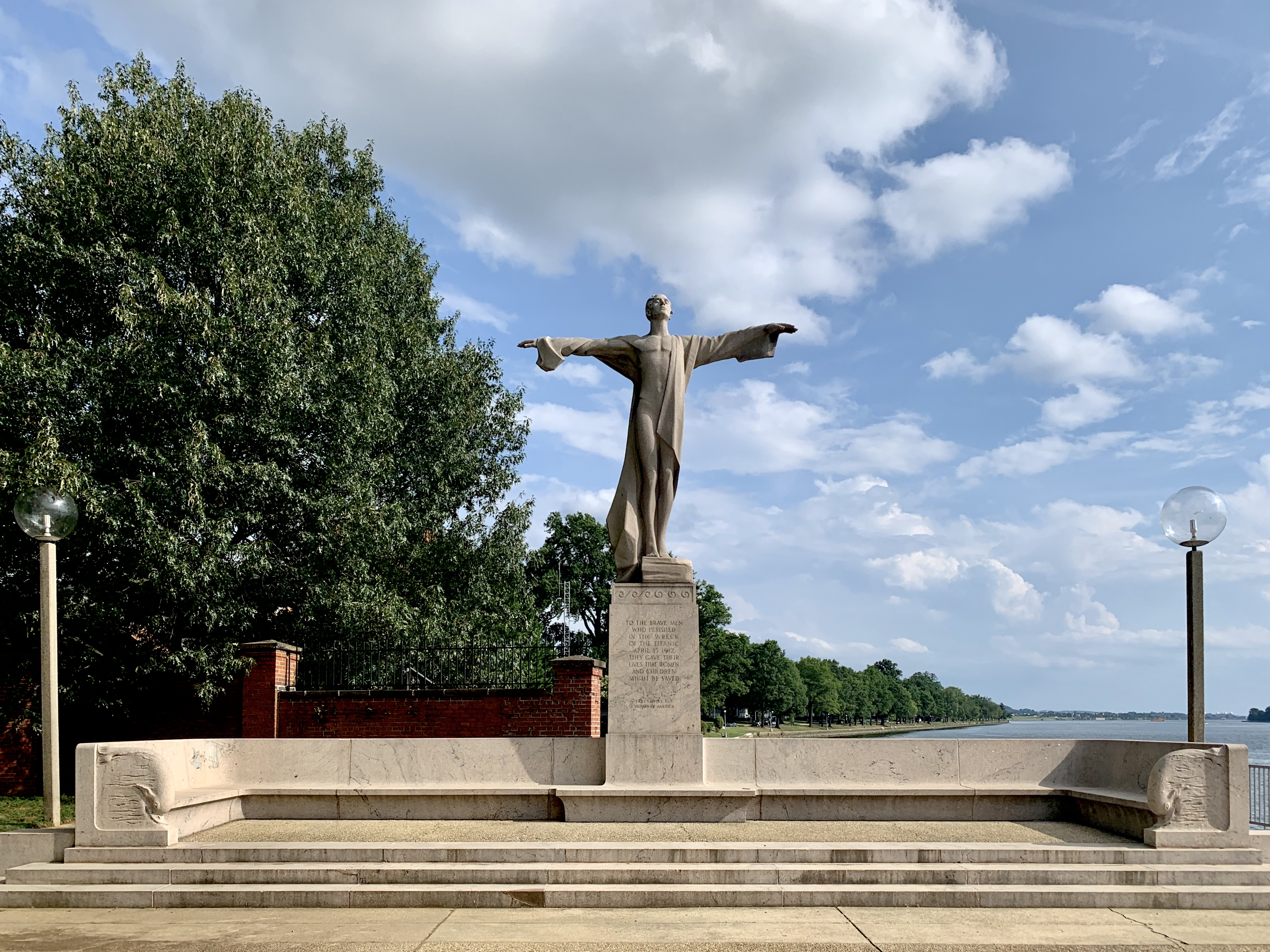
Titanic Memorial located beside the Washington Channel in Southwest Waterfront

Due to its history of urban redevelopment, most of the Southwest Waterfront neighborhood is composed of large cooperatives or condominiums, often containing both townhouses and apartment buildings. Most of the building projects are examples of Modern Architecture.

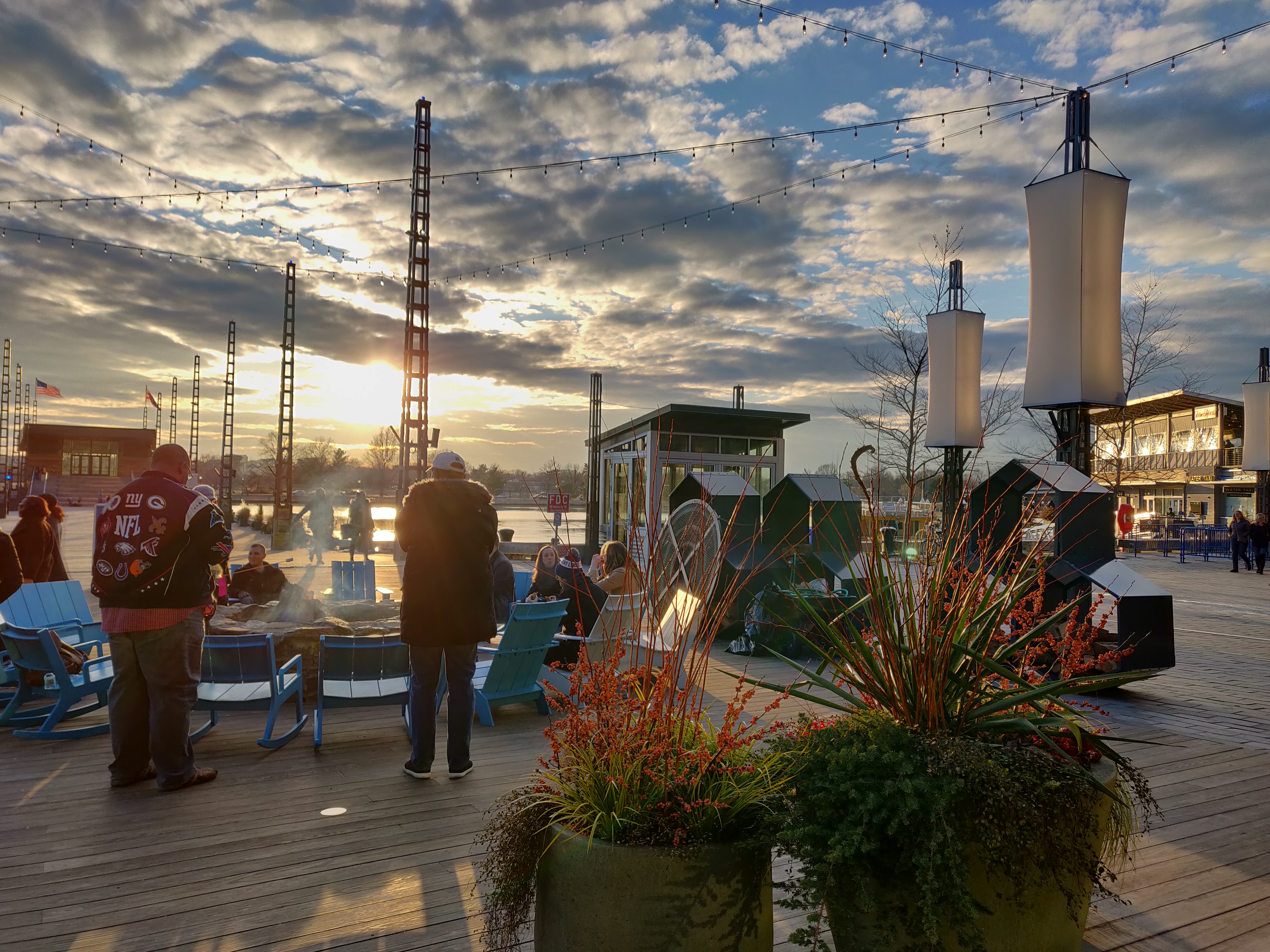
The fire pit at The Wharf

Constructed in 1962, River Park contains townhouses and a glass and aluminum high-rise building that architect Charles Goodman designed. Constructed in 1965 in a pinwheel shape with a large courtyard and with town houses in its quadrants, Tiber Island, which architects Keyes, Lethbridge & Condon designed, received the American Institute of Architects award for Multi-Family Residential design in 1966. Carrollsburg was completed in 1967 and developed as a companion piece to Tiber Island by the same architects.

In 1968, the Titanic Memorial was moved to the Washington Channel, near Fort McNair in Southwest Waterfront.

The Washington Metro built the Waterfront Metro station on its Green Line and opened it in 1991.

The District of Columbia Public Library operates a branch library in the neighborhood. The Southwest Neighborhood Library was first opened in 1940 as part of the then-new Thomas Jefferson Memorial Junior High School and then reopened in its current location in 1965. In 2019, it was fully demolished and reopened with a completely new structure May 15, 2021 (at a cost of approximately $18 million). The new Southwest Library offers a large meeting room, multiple smaller conference and study rooms, an outdoor reading porch, and an Innovation Lab with 3D printers. It features an environmentally sustainable design with solar panels and a green roof, and received LEED Platinum certification for environmental design.

== Redevelopment ==
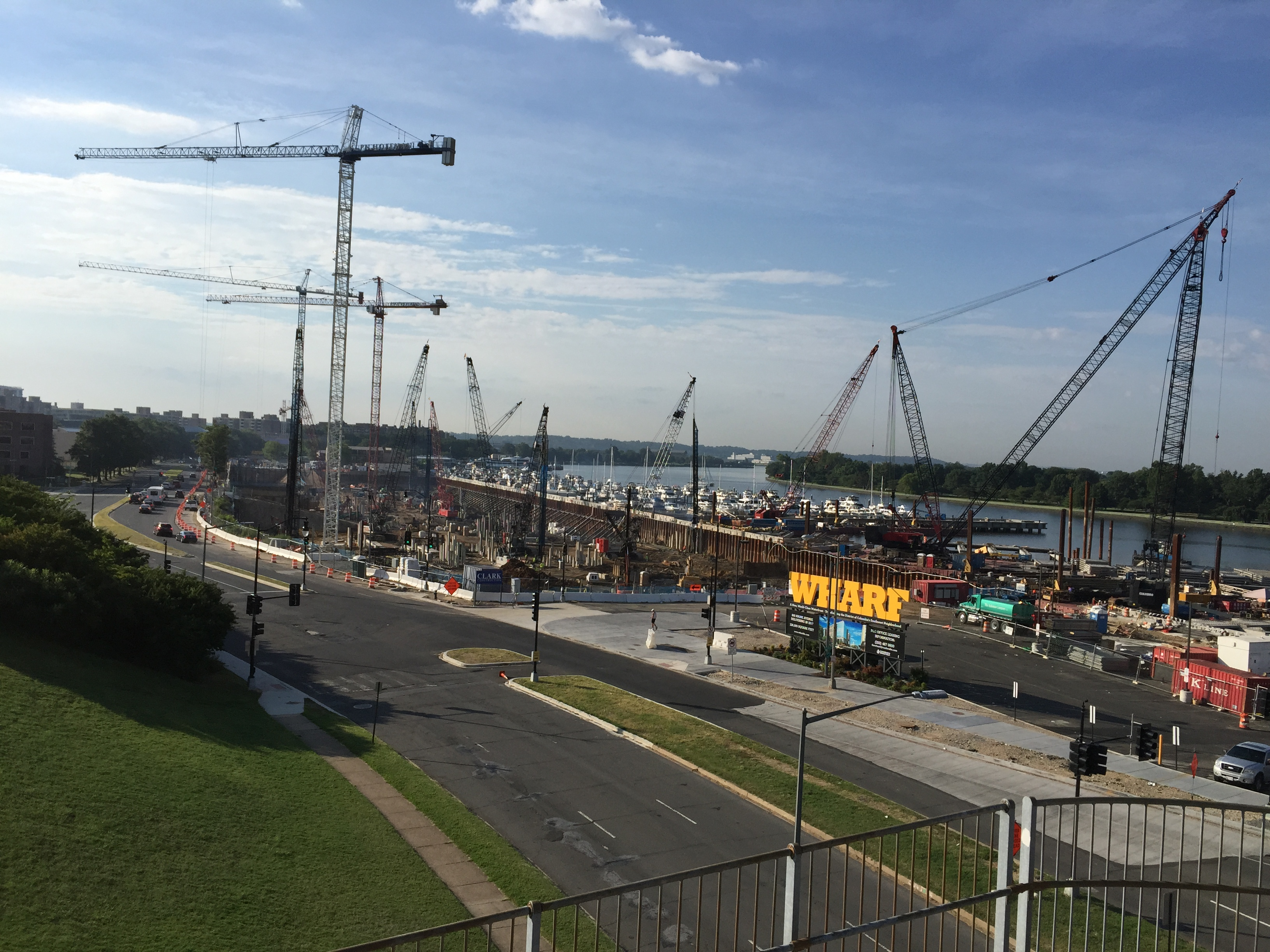
Construction of The Wharf in August 2015

Starting around 2003, the Southwest Waterfront began gentrifying. A number of the neighborhood's apartment buildings began extensive renovations and condominium conversions. Residential and commercial developers started to take a more serious interest in Southwest. In 2004, the city announced that it would build the new Washington Nationals baseball stadium just across South Capitol Street from Southwest.

The Southwest Waterfront has been targeted as a site for the next wave of DC redevelopment. Large development projects include a mixed retail-commercial-residential development at Fourth & M Streets SW (Waterfront Station); the expansion and redesign of Arena Stage; and the redesign and overhaul of the waterfront itself, to include residences, office space, hotels, and retail establishments.

On March 19, 2014, developers PN Hoffman and Madison Marquette broke ground on a massive redevelopment of D.C.’s Southwest Waterfront into a mixed-use complex named "The Wharf". Stretching across 24 acres of land and more than 50 acres of water from the Municipal Fish Market to Fort McNair, The Wharf, when complete, will feature more than 3 million square feet of residential, office, hotel, retail, cultural, and public uses including waterfront parks, promenades, piers and docks. The first phase of the redevelopment project opened with a four-day series of public events during October 2017.

In April 2017, the National Capital Planning Commission (NCPC) approved plans for a staircase and bicycle paths through Benjamin Banneker Park to connect the Mall and L'Enfant Plaza to the Southwest Waterfront. In addition, the project would add lighting and trees to the area. The NCPC and the National Park Service intended the project to be an interim improvement that could be in place for ten years while the area awaited further redevelopment. Hoffman-Madison Waterfront and the District of Columbia government agreed to invest $4 million in the project in an effort to improve neighborhood connectivity in the area. Construction began on the project in September 2017 and was completed during the spring of 2018.

== Notable residents ==
Current and former residents of Southwest D.C. include the late House Representative John Conyers and former Police Chief Charles H. Ramsey. Hubert Humphrey lived there while serving as U.S. Vice President, and Thurgood Marshall, Lewis Powell, and David Souter all had homes in Southwest during their tenures on the United States Supreme Court. Singer Marvin Gaye spent his youth (until about age 15) living at the Fairfax Apartments (now demolished) at 1617 1st Street SW in the Southwest Waterfront neighborhood, during which time he attended Syphax Elementary School and then Randall Junior High School.

== See also ==
- DC Waterfront, Maine Avenue - painting of the area by artist Delilah Pierce
- The Wharf (Washington, D.C.)
