= Holmes Run Acres =

- Holmes Run Acres Historic District
- U.S. National Register of Historic Places
- U.S. Historic district
- Virginia Landmarks Register
- Fairfax County Inventory of Historic Sites
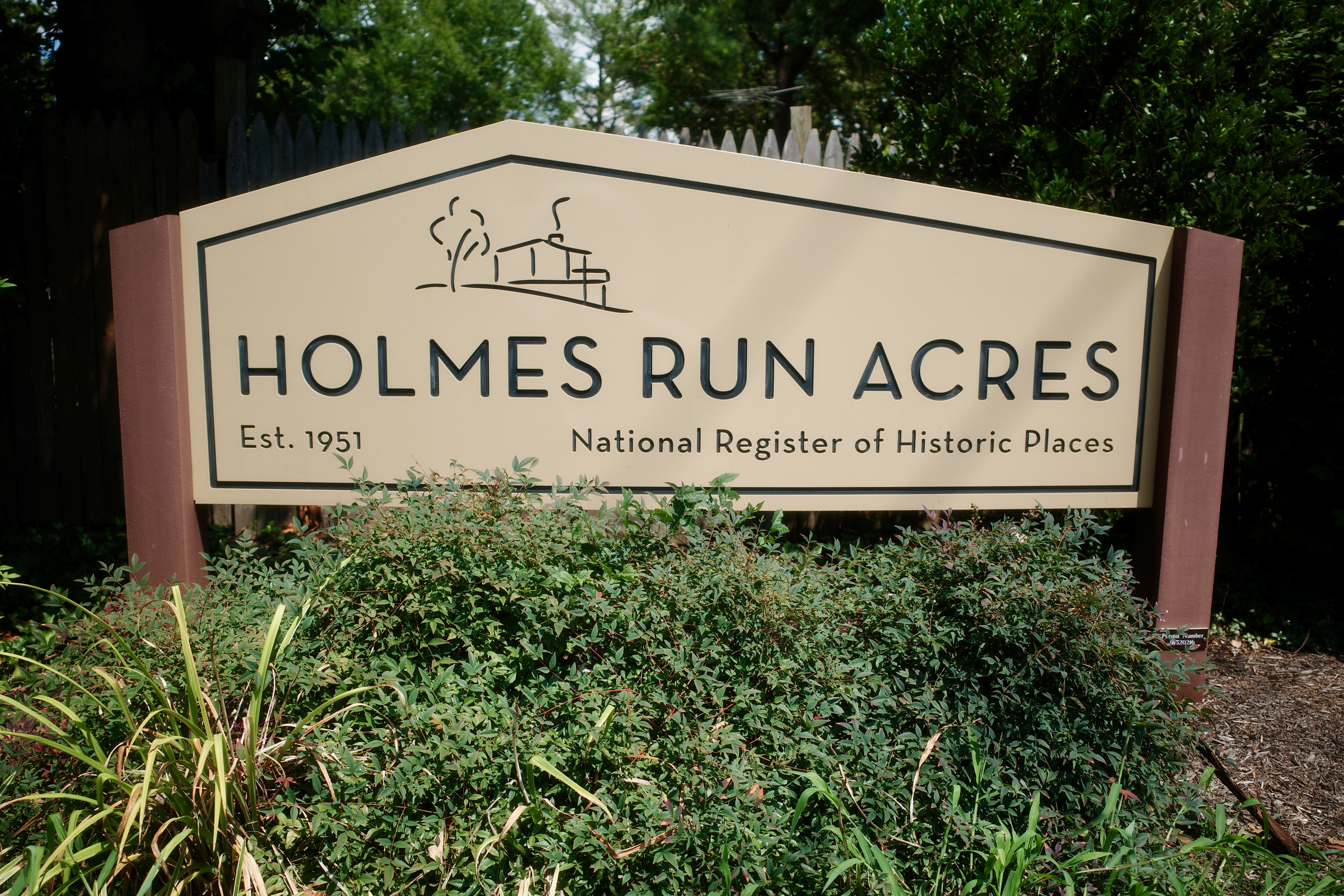
- Sign at an entrance of Holmes Run Acres

- Location within Northern Virginia Location within Virginia Location within the United States
- Nearest city: Falls Church, Virginia
- Coordinates: 38°51′00″N 77°12′30″W
- Area: 140 acres (57 ha)
- Built: 1951 - 1960
- Architect: Francis Donald Lethbridge, Nicholas Satterlee, et al.
- Architectural style: Mid-Century modern / Modern Movement
- NRHP reference No.: 07000230
- VLR No.: 029-5183

Significant dates
- Added to NRHP: March 22, 2007
- Designated VLR: December 6, 2006
- Designated FCIHS: September 12, 1972

Holmes Run Acres is a community of 355 houses in Fairfax County, Virginia, in the Washington, D.C. suburbs. Nearly all of the neighborhood is within the Holmes Run Acres Historic District, listed on the National Register of Historic Places.

The first Fairfax County subdivision designed by architects Nicholas Satterlee and Francis D. Lethbridge, Holmes Run Acres influenced the architecture and site planning at nearby Pine Spring and elsewhere, including the Potomac Overlook and Carderock Springs historic districts in Montgomery County, Maryland.

Holmes Run Acres also includes Woodburn Elementary School, the Holmes Run Acres Recreation Association community pool, and Luria Park, a 4.2-acre (17,000 m^{2}) Fairfax County park that has been planned and maintained jointly by the county and local residents since the 1950s.

== History ==
Holmes Run Acres was developed by brothers Gerald and Eli Luria, who offered the public "a unique opportunity to own a contemporary style home" in the Holmes Run stream valley. Eli Luria, who attended art school at the Corcoran School and UCLA, cited his introduction to Francis D. Lethbridge, and a 1939 speech by Frank Lloyd Wright, as the Lurias' inspiration to build modern homes. Architect Lethbridge cited Harvard architecture professor Walter Gropius and the Bauhaus movement as influences.

Holmes Run Acres houses were "individually positioned with regard to street, neighbors, terrain, [and] climate factors." Despite designing only a few basic house types—a cost-saving measure dictated by the builders—Satterlee and Lethbridge "attained [variety] by shifting the position of houses on the lots, putting carports in different positions... and by varying the street patterns." Meticulous site planning, including the architects' subdivision of the land into irregularly-sized and shaped lots, was "an important factor in the general attractiveness of Holmes Run Acres."

Homes in Holmes Run Acres were constructed in three phases between 1951 and 1960:

- Luria Brothers Development - approximately 260 homes during 1951–52. Architects: Nicholas Satterlee and Francis D. Lethbridge
- Gaddy & Gaddy Construction Company - 71 homes during 1954–55. Architects: Nicholas Satterlee and Francis D. Lethbridge
- Andre Bodor - 15 units during 1957–60

The Luria brothers built their homes west of Executive Avenue, Gaddy built homes east of Executive Avenue, and Bodor built homes at the connection of Surrey Lane and Gallows Road.

The Southwest Research Institute's Housing Research Foundation awarded Holmes Run Acres its seal of approval in July 1951, praising the "frank expression of [exposed] post-and-beam construction" and the architects' consideration for the orientation and privacy of each home. In 1952 the foundation's merit award jurors, including Philip Johnson and Douglas Haskell, cited Homes Run Acres for an honorable mention—with first place awarded to builder Joseph Eichler, and California architects Anshen & Allen and Jones & Emmons, for their work on four pioneer Eichler subdivisions.

In the early 1950s Holmes Run Acres Civic Association organized construction of the first community swimming pool in Fairfax County and, in cooperation with the Fairfax County Park Authority, turned a dump site into Luria Park, the first neighborhood park in the county.

Woodburn School opened in 1953, with Holmes Run Acres residents responsible for preservation of trees and construction of the original playground and tennis courts at Woodburn. A year later, in the wake of the landmark Brown v. Board of Education ruling, the membership of the Woodburn PTA "stepped forward as the first school organization in [Fairfax] county to express formal approval of [school] integration."

== Historic designation ==
Holmes Run Acres was listed on the Virginia Landmarks Register in December 2006, and on the National Register of Historic Places in March 2007. Holmes Run Acres is the first Mid-Century modern community in Virginia to be designated as a landmark/historic place.

The listed district is 140-acre (57 ha) that included, in 2007, 291 contributing buildings, three contributing sites, and one other contributing structure.

== See also ==
- Cedar Lane Unitarian Universalist Church, designed by Keyes, Lethbridge, & Condon in association with Pietro Belluschi
- Tiber Island Cooperative Homes, designed by Keyes, Lethbridge & Condon
- List of memorials and monuments at Arlington National Cemetery, where Lethbridge was responsible for master planning and the design of the visitors' center
- New Mark Commons, designed by Keyes, Lethbridge & Condon
- Pope–Leighey House, a Frank Lloyd Wright house originally located in the Fairfax County section of Falls Church
- Hollin Hills, pioneer Fairfax County subdivision designed by Charles M. Goodman
- Vernon DeMars, Berkeley architect who hired Satterlee and Arthur Keyes, Jr. in the 1940s to work on Bannockburn, an early attempt at a co-op planned unit development in Montgomery County
- Chloethiel Woodard Smith, architect and planner who shared an architecture practice with Keyes, Satterlee and Lethbridge, and office space with Woodburn Elementary architect Francis Palms, Jr.
- Arthur Cotton Moore, worked for Satterlee & Smith
- Hugh Newell Jacobsen, noted architect who designed six houses in the Truro section of Annandale and previously worked for Keyes, Lethbridge and Condon
- Lake Barcroft, with planning by The Architects Collaborative and houses designed by Goodman, Gropius, Harry Ormston, Keyes, and Lethbridge
- Reston, Virginia, a "new town" with early sections designed by Smith, Goodman, and James Rossant
- Southwest Waterfront, site of Southwest D.C. urban renewal area designed in part by Smith, Goodman, I.M. Pei, and Keyes, Condon & Lethbridge
