= Keyes, Lethbridge & Condon =

American architectural firm

Keyes, Lethbridge & Condon Keyes Condon Florance

Practice information
- Partners: David H. Condon FAIA; Thomas Eichbaum FAIA; Philip Esocoff FAIA; Colden Florance FAIA; Arthur H. Keyes Jr. FAIA; David King FAIA; Francis D. Lethbridge FAIA; Nicholas Satterlee FAIA; Chloethiel Woodard Smith FAIA
- Founders: Keyes, Lethbridge, Satterlee and Smith
- Founded: 1951
- Dissolved: 1997
- Location: Washington, D.C.

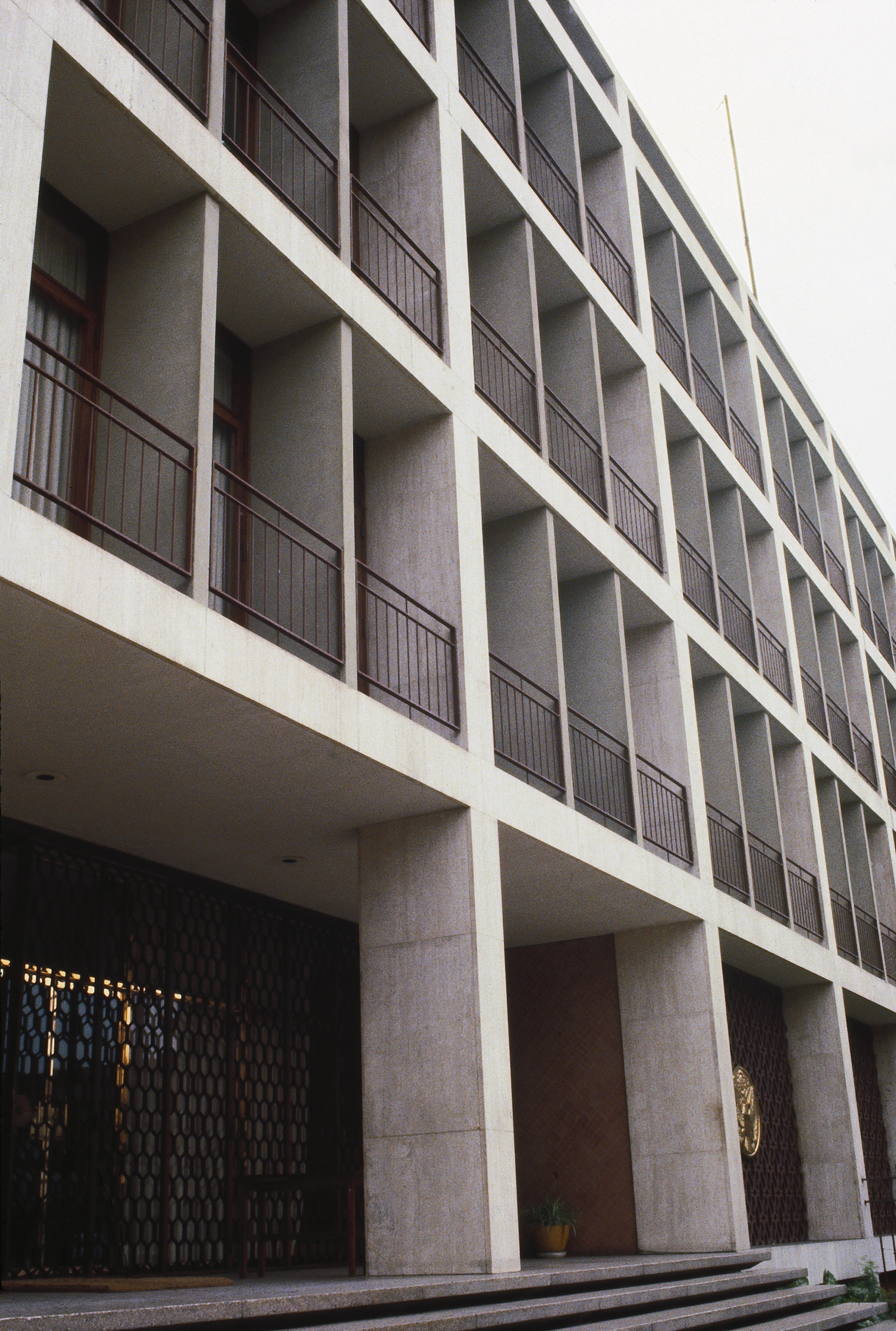
The former Embassy of the United States in Lima, designed by Keyes & Lethbridge and completed in 1959.

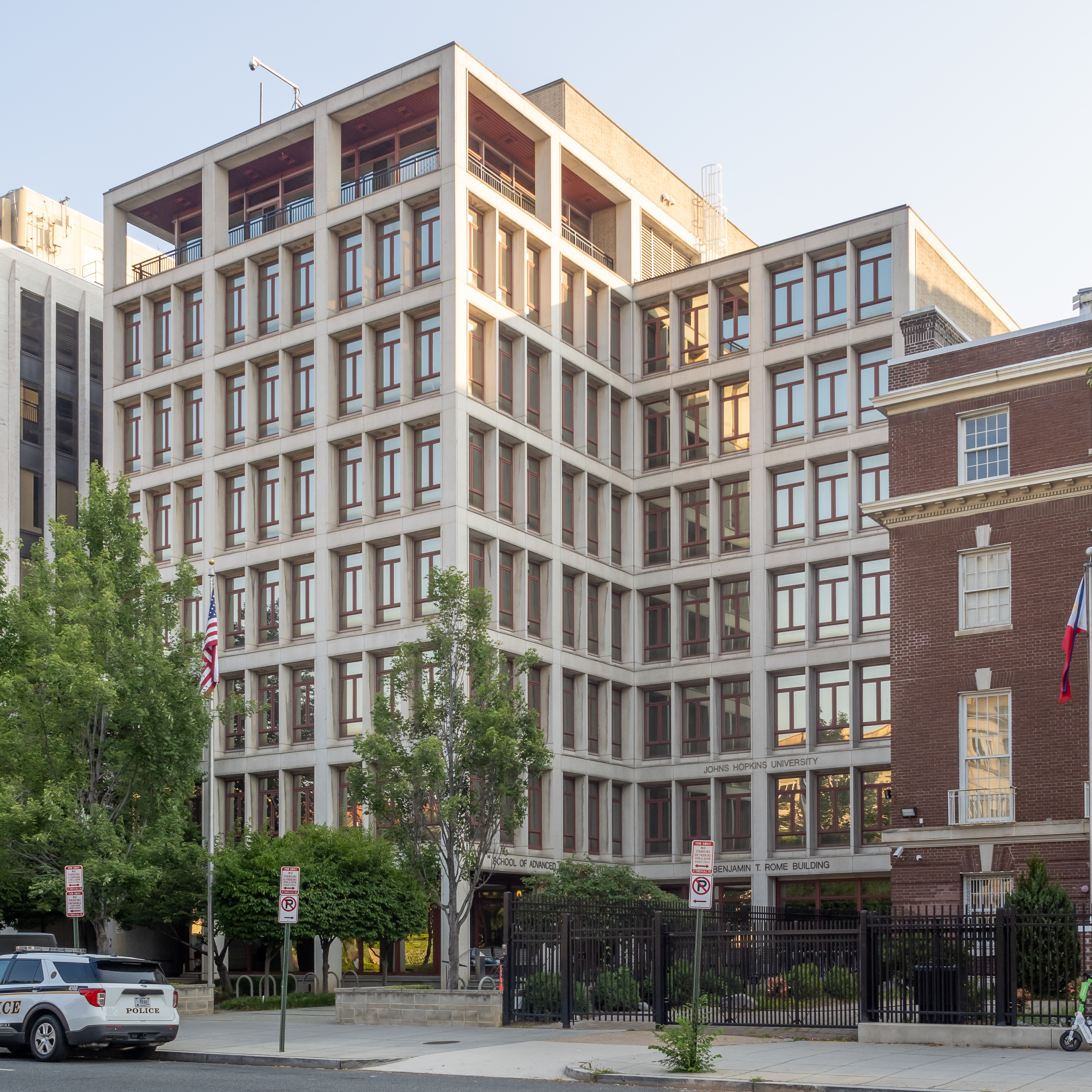
The former Forest Industries Building in Washington, D.C., designed by Keyes, Lethbridge & Condon and completed in 1961. Now the Benjamin T. Rome Building of Johns Hopkins University.

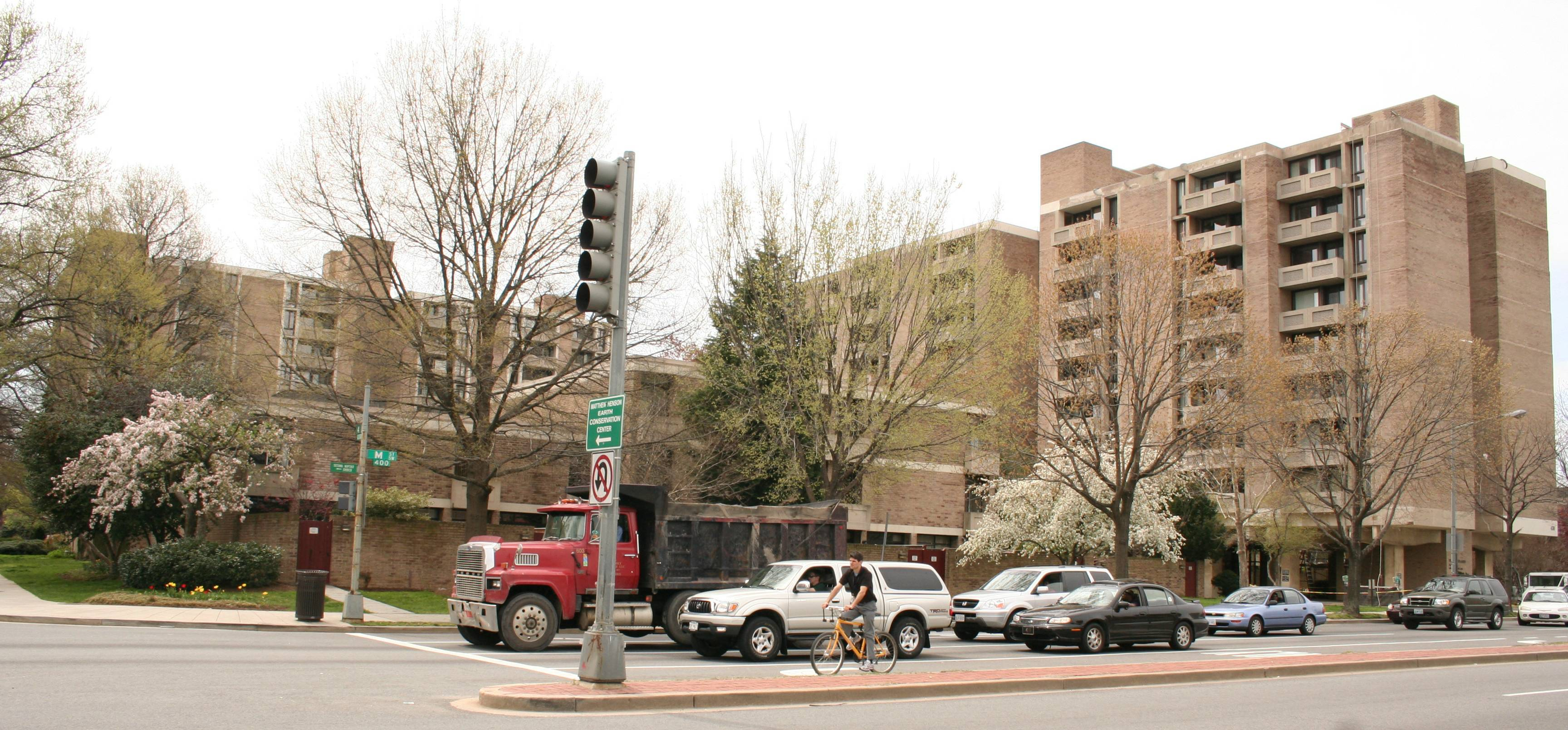
The Tiber Island Cooperative Homes, designed by Keyes, Lethbridge & Condon and completed in 1965.

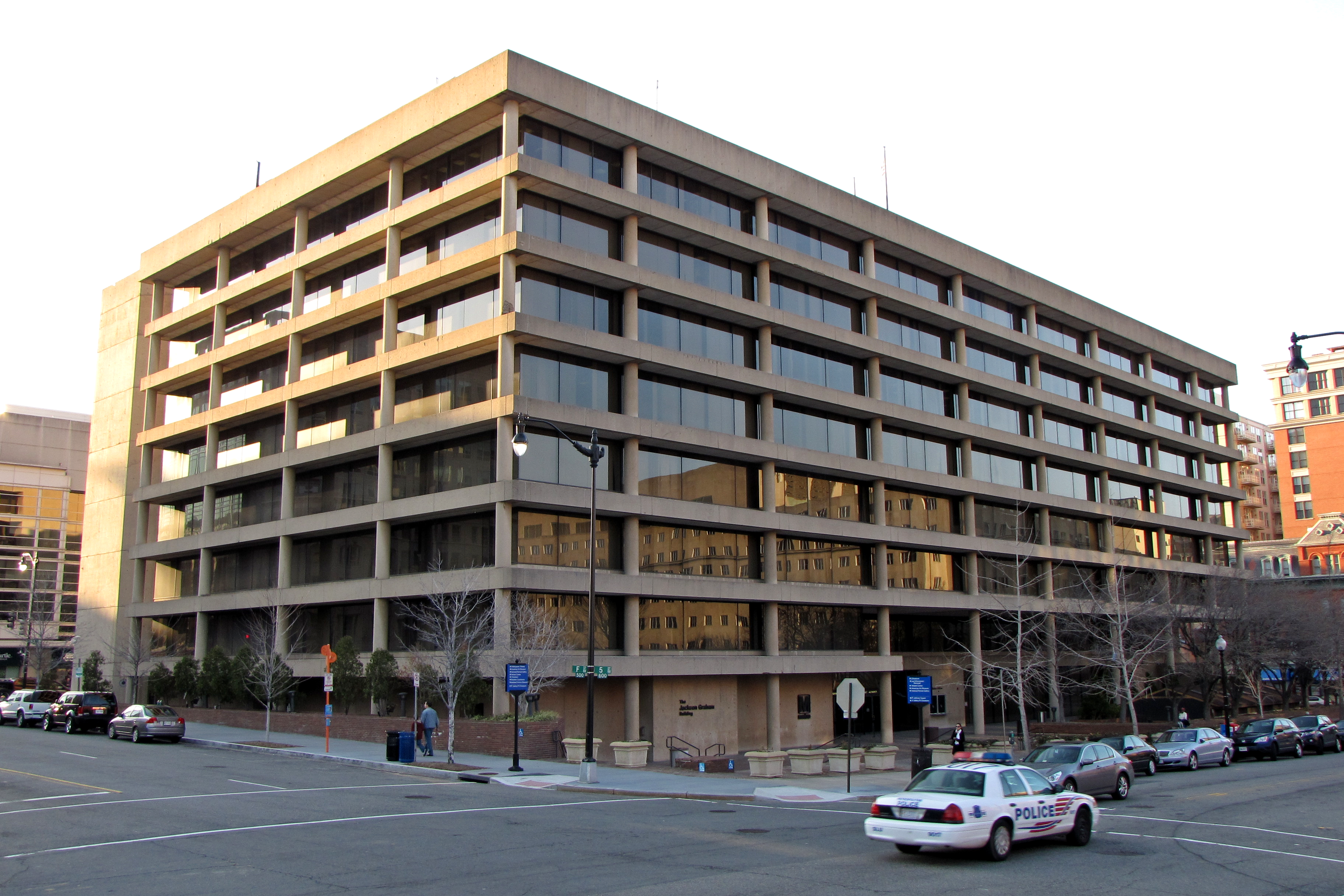
The Jackson Graham Building in Washington, D.C., designed by Keyes, Lethbridge & Condon and completed in 1974.

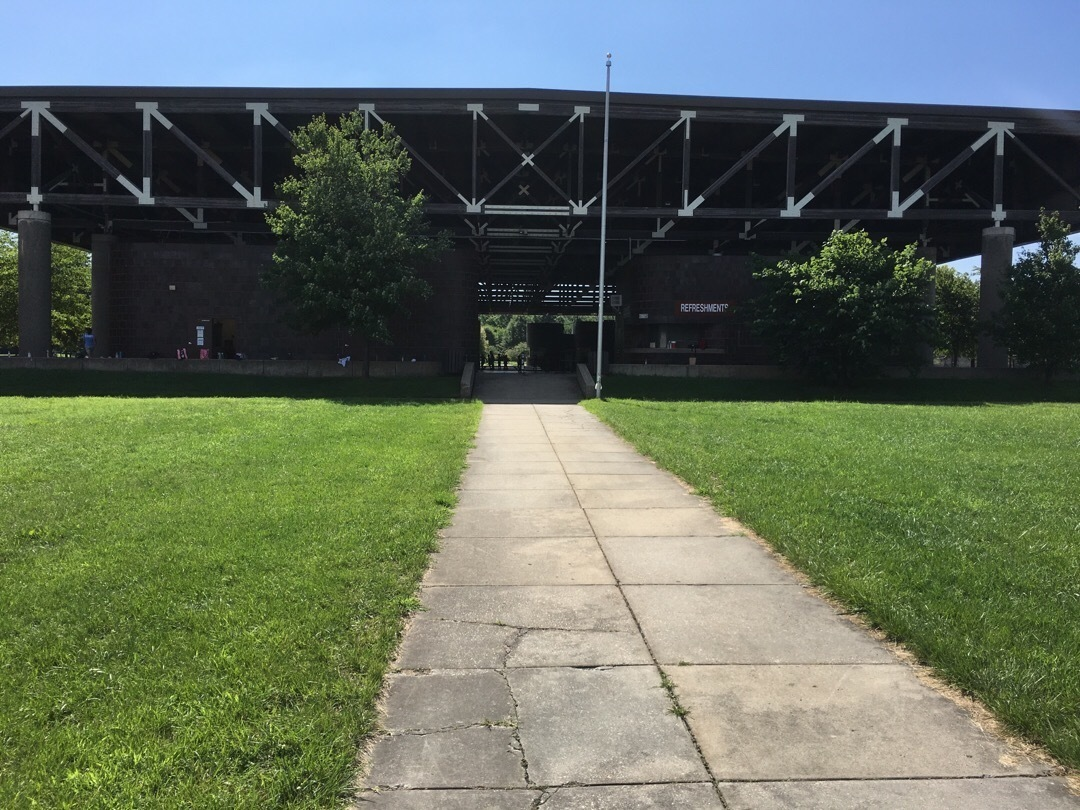
The pavilion at Anacostia Park, designed by Keyes Condon Florance and completed in 1977.

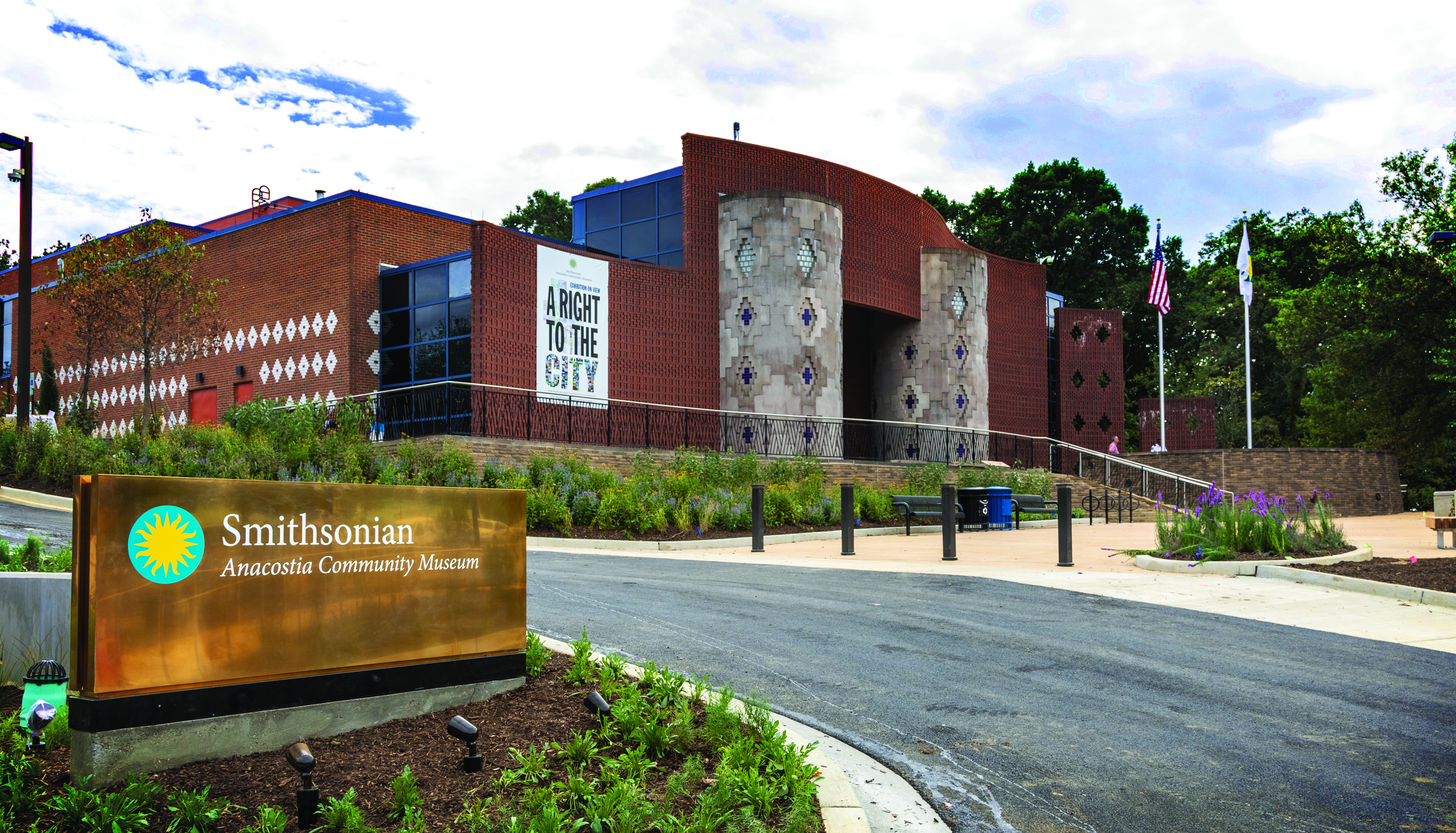
The Anacostia Community Museum, designed by Keyes Condon Florance and completed in 1987.

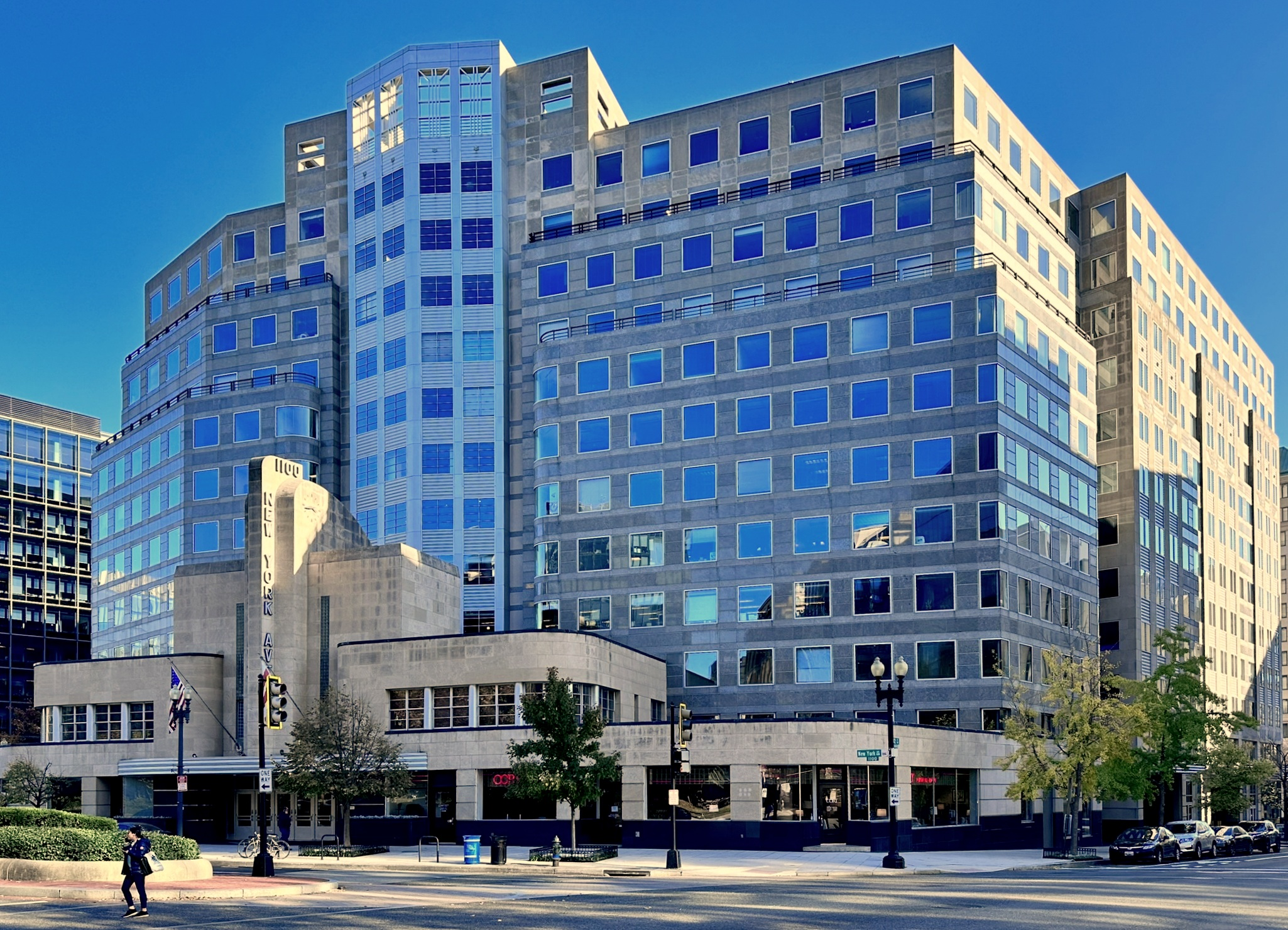
The 1100 New York Avenue office building in Washington, D.C., designed by Keyes Condon Florance and completed in 1991.

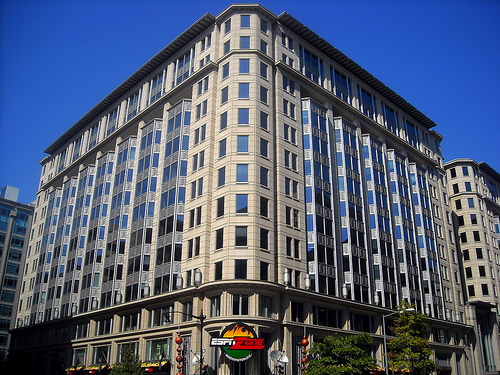
The Thurman Arnold Building in Washington, D.C., designed by Florance Eichbaum Esocoff King and completed in 1995.

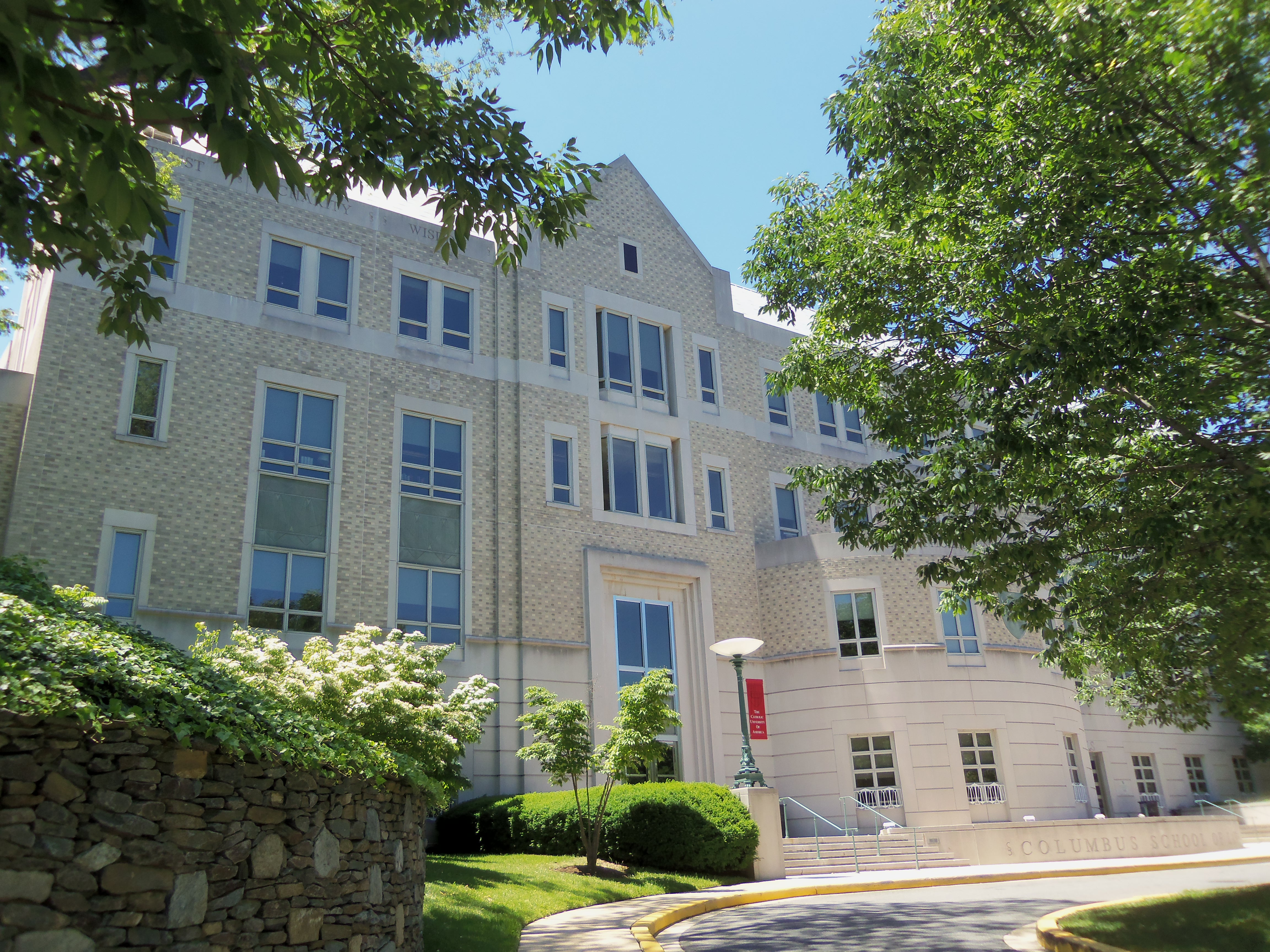
The Columbus School of Law of the Catholic University of America, designed by Florance Eichbaum Esocoff King and completed in 1995.

Keyes, Lethbridge & Condon was an American architectural firm active, under several different names, in Washington, D.C. from 1951 to 1997. It was founded in 1951 as Keyes, Smith, Satterlee & Lethbridge before splitting into Keyes & Lethbridge and Satterlee & Smith in 1956. Keyes & Lethbridge became Keyes, Lethbridge & Condon in 1958 and Keyes Condon Florance in 1975. After two more name changes it reverted to Keyes Condon Florance in 1995 and was merged into SmithGroup in 1997.

== History ==
Keyes, Lethbridge & Condon was established in 1951 as Keyes, Smith, Satterlee & Lethbridge, the partnership of Arthur H. Keyes Jr., Chloethiel Woodard Smith, Nicholas Satterlee and Francis D. Lethbridge. All four had met working in the office of Berla & Abel, which was known as an incubator for young design talent. They were modernists, and their work adhered to the architectural principles of the modern movement. In 1956 the firm was divided into two new firms, Keyes & Lethbridge and Satterlee & Smith. Smith's firm, which became Chloethiel Woodard Smith & Associates in 1963, was the largest woman-owned architectural practice in the country.

In 1958 Keyes & Lethbridge was joined by a third partner, David H. Condon, and the firm was renamed Keyes, Lethbridge & Condon. In the 1960s the firm developed into the strongest design firm in the district and was well known for large residential and institutional projects. In their designs, the partners adhered to the architectural principles of the modern movement. During this time they completed several award-winning projects, including the Tiber Island Cooperative Homes and the River Road Unitarian Universalist Church in Bethesda, both completed in 1965. The firm declined in size in the 1970s, but in 1973 they were joined in partnership by Colden Florance, a former employee.

Florance brought into the firm a focus on new project types, especially commercial projects. Lethbridge withdrew from the partnership in 1975 and the firm was renamed Keyes Condon Florance. The increase in new projects led to significant growth, and in 1985 four new partners, Thomas Eichbaum, Philip Esocoff and David King, were added. Florance, Eichbaum, Esocoff and King adopted a more pluralistic approach to design than the founders and embraced postmodernism and other contemporary trends. During these years the firm completed many office buildings as well as the conversion of historic buildings into the National Building Museum (1985), the National Museum of Women in the Arts (1987), and the National Postal Museum (1993). In 1991, as Keyes and Condon moved towards retirement, the name of the firm was extended to Keyes Condon/Florance Eichbaum Esocoff King. This was reduced to Florance Eichbaum Esocoff King in 1992.

In 1995 Esocoff withdrew from the partnership, and the firm returned to its former name of Keyes Condon Florance. In October 1996, Florance and SmithGroup announced plans to merge Keyes Condon Florance into SmithGroup's Washington office, creating the largest architectural office in the city. The merger took effect at the start of 1997. Florance's initial role was as managing director of the office. He retired in 2011.

== Partner biographies ==
=== Arthur H. Keyes Jr. ===
Arthur Hawkins Keyes Jr. FAIA (May 26, 1917 – June 7, 2012) was born in Rutland, Vermont. He was educated at Princeton University and the Harvard Graduate School of Design, graduating from the latter with a BArch in 1942. He worked for architects Berla & Abel and Burket, Neufeld & DeMars until 1949, when he opened his own office. During World War II he served in the naval reserve.

Keyes was married in 1941 to Lucille Sheppard and had three children. He died in Washington at the age of 95.

=== Francis D. Lethbridge ===
Francis Donald Lethbridge FAIA (October 5, 1920 – April 17, 2008), was born in Hackensack, New Jersey. He was educated at the Stevens Institute of Technology and Yale University, graduating from the latter in 1946. During World War II he served in the naval reserve. He worked for architects Berla & Abel and Faulkner, Kingsbury & Stenhouse before establishing Satterlee & Lethbridge with Nicholas Satterlee in 1950. The work of Satterlee & Lethbridge included Holmes Run Acres (1951).

As chair of the federal Joint Committee on Landmarks of the National Capital, Lethbridge helped establish the District of Columbia Inventory of Historic Sites. In 1965 he was also coauthor of the first edition of the AIA Guide to the Architecture of Washington, D.C. Upon leaving Keyes, Lethbridge & Condon in 1975 he established an independent practice, Francis D. Lethbridge & Associates, which had a focus on preservation. He retired in 1990.

Lethbridge was married to Mary Jane Christopher in 1947 and had four children. He died in Nantucket, Massachusetts at the age of 87.

=== David H. Condon ===
David Holt Condon FAIA (March 15, 1916 – July 14, 1996), was born in Pasadena, California and was educated at the University of California, Berkeley, graduating with an AB in architecture in 1939. He served in the naval reserve during World War II, after which he moved to Washington, where he joined the office of Charles M. Goodman, Keyes, Smith, Satterlee & Lethbridge and Ronald S. Senseman before rejoining Keyes & Lethbridge in 1956.

Condon was married to Sylvia Marquez in 1947 and had two children. He died at home in Chevy Chase, Maryland at the age of 80.

=== Colden Florance ===
Colden l'Hommedieu Ruggles "Coke" Florance FAIA (January 24, 1931 – December 28, 2023) was born in Baltimore. He was educated at Princeton University, earning an AB in 1952 and an MFA in 1955. He served in the navy until 1959, when he joined Satterlee & Smith before moving to Keyes, Lethbridge & Condon in 1961. He left in 1968 to form the partnership of Florance & Cohalan and later managed a solo practice before returning to Keyes, Lethbridge & Condon.

Florance was married three times: to Barbara Dale Crosby, Elizabeth Owens and Nancy Griscom. He had three children. He died in Washington at the age of 92.

== Legacy ==
Like Berla & Abel before them, Keyes, Lethbridge & Condon and its successors were noted as incubators for young architects. Their most notable alumni were George E. Hartman Jr. and Warren J. Cox, who founded Hartman-Cox Architects in 1965 after leaving the firm, and Hugh Newell Jacobsen, who worked for the firm in 1957–58. Other employees who established successful local and regional practices include Heather Cass of Cass & Associates, Winthrop W. Faulkner, William C. Gridley of Bowie Gridley Architects, and Jack McCartney and Anne McCutcheon Lewis of McCartney Lewis Architects.

The partners were recognized by the architectural community for their excellence in design. All of the name partners were elected Fellows of the American Institute of Architects (AIA), the AIA's highest membership honor.

== Architectural works ==
=== Keyes, Smith, Satterlee & Lethbridge, 1951–1956 ===
- 1954 – Pine Spring development, Fairfax County, Virginia
- 1955 – Chestnut Lodge therapy building, (Note: Demolished.) 500 W Montgomery Ave, Rockville, Maryland
- 1956 – Robert W. Komer house, Lake Barcroft, Fairfax County, Virginia
- 1957 – Embassy of the United States, (Note: Designed principally by Smith.) Av Mcal Lopez, Asunción, Paraguay

=== Keyes & Lethbridge, 1956–1958 ===
- 1958 – Cedar Lane Unitarian Universalist Congregation, (Note: Designed by Keyes & Lethbridge, architects, with Pietro Belluschi, associated architect. Designed principally by Belluschi.) 9601 Cedar Ln, Bethesda, Maryland
- 1959 – Embassy of the United States (former), Av Garcilaso de la Vega 1420, Lima, Peru

=== Keyes, Lethbridge & Condon, 1958–1975 ===
- 1959 – Flint Hill development, Bethesda, Maryland
- 1960 – Potomac Overlook development, Bethesda, Maryland
- 1961 – Forest Industries Building (former), (Note: Now the Benjamin T. Rome Building of Johns Hopkins University.) 1619 Massachusetts Ave NW, Washington, D.C.
- 1961 – "House of Wood" (Hoffberger-Goldstein residence), Bethesda, Maryland
- 1963 – Columbia Plaza development, (Note: Designed by Keyes, Lethbridge & Condon, architects, with DeMars & Reay, associate architects.) 2400 Virginia Ave NW, Washington, D.C.
- 1965 – River Road Unitarian Universalist Congregation, 6301 River Rd, Bethesda, Maryland
- 1965 – Tiber Island and Carrollsburg Square developments, 4th St SW, Washington, D.C.
- 1966 – Carderock Springs development, Bethesda, Maryland
- 1967 – New Mark Commons development, Bethesda, Maryland
- 1969 – Sunderland Building, 1390 19th St NW, Washington, D.C.
- 1970 – Jefferson Tower, (Note: Designed by Keyes, Lethbridge & Condon, architects, with Pederson, Hueber, Hares & Glavin, associate architects.) 50 Presidential Plaz, Syracuse, New York
- 1974 – Washington Metropolitan Area Transit Authority Jackson Graham Building, (Note: Altered.) 600 5th St NW, Washington, D.C.

=== Keyes Condon Florance, 1975–1991 and 1995–1996 ===
- 1977 – Skating pavilion, Anacostia Park, Washington, D.C.
- 1980 – Steuart Building, St. Albans School, Washington, D.C.
- 1983 – National Gallery of Art renovation, Constitution Ave NW, Washington, D.C.
- 1984 – Theodore N. Lerner Hall, George Washington University
- 1985 – National Building Museum, (Note: Designed by Keyes Condon Florance, architects, with Giorgio Cavaglieri, associated architect.) 401 F St NW, Washington, D.C.
- 1986 – Presidential Plaza, 900 19th St NW, Washington, D.C.
- 1987 – Anacostia Community Museum, 1901 Fort Pl SE, Washington, D.C.
- 1987 – National Museum of Women in the Arts, 1250 New York Ave NW, Washington, D.C.
- 1987 – Republic Place, 1776 I St NW, Washington, D.C.
- 1990 – Office building, 1717 H St NW, Washington, D.C.
- 1989 – Office building, 750 17th St NW, Washington, D.C.
- 1991 – Liberty Place, 881 3rd St NW, Washington, D.C.
- 1991 – Office building, 2401 Pennsylvania Ave NW, Washington, D.C.
- 1991 – Office building, 1100 New York Ave NW, Washington, D.C.
- 1992 – King Street Station complex, Duke St, Alexandria, Virginia
- 1999 – Kansas City Union Station rehabilitation, (Note: Designed by Ehrenkrantz, Eckstut & Kuhn and Keyes Condon Florance, associated architects.) 30 W Pershing Rd, Kansas City, Missouri

=== Florance Eichbaum Esocoff King, 1992–1995 ===
- 1993 – Exploration Hall, George Washington University Virginia Science and Technology Campus, Ashburn, Virginia
- 1993 – National Postal Museum, 2 Massachusetts Ave NE, Washington, D.C.
- 1993 – Oval Offices, 800 Connecticut Ave NW, Washington, D.C.
- 1994 – Columbus School of Law, Catholic University of America, Washington, D.C.
- 1995 – Thurman Arnold Building, 555 12th St NW, Washington, D.C.
- 1997 – Time-Life Building, 1940 Duke St, Alexandria, Virginia
