= Carderock =

Carderock may refer to a location in the United States:

- Carderock, Maryland, along the Potomac River near Washington, D.C.
  - Carderock Division of the Naval Surface Warfare Center
  - Carderock Springs Historic District
  - Carderock Recreation Area a climbing area
