= Sun Building =

- U.S. National Register of Historic Places
- D.C. Inventory of Historic Sites
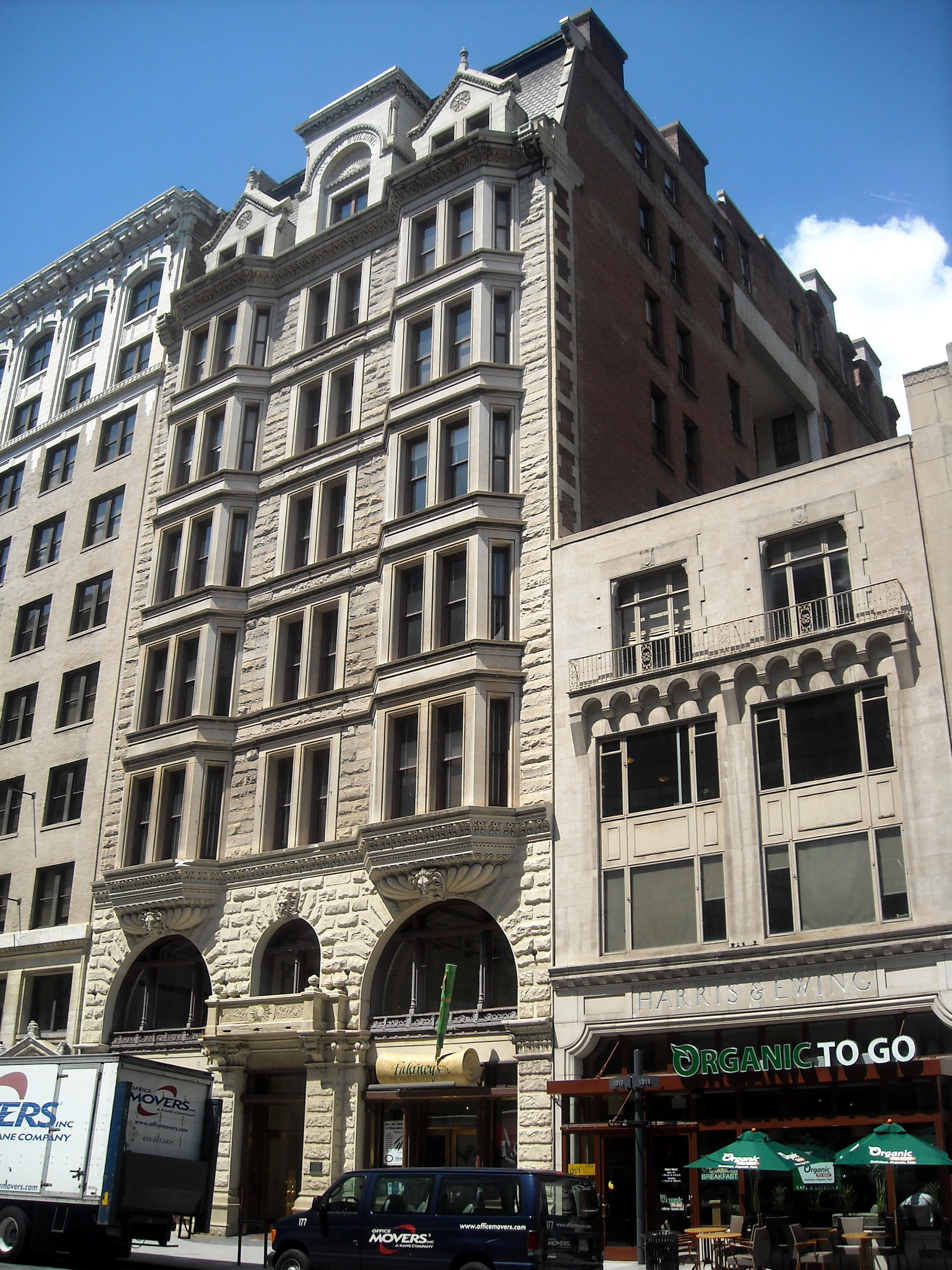
- Sun Building in 2008

- Location within Central Washington, D.C. Location within the District of Columbia Location within the United States
- Location: 1317 F Street, N.W. Washington, D.C., U.S.
- Coordinates: 38°53′51.2″N 77°1′49.5″W
- Built: 1885
- Architect: Alfred B. Mullett
- NRHP reference No.: 85000650

Significant dates
- Added to NRHP: March 27, 1985
- Designated DCIHS: December 21, 1983

The Sun Building (also known as the Baltimore Sun Building or American Bank Building) is a historic building, located at 1317 F Street, Northwest, Washington, D.C., in the Downtown Washington, D.C. neighborhood.

== History ==
The Baltimore Sun had covered Washington since the paper's inception in the 1830s and opened a Washington bureau at 1418 F Street NW in 1872. However, the newspaper quickly outgrew that building. The newspaper's founder, Arunah Shepherdson Abell identified a vacant lot nearby, blocks from the Treasury Department and the White House.

It was designed by Alfred B. Mullett and constructed from 1885 to 1887, by John H. Howlett. After Abell's death in 1888, the building's management was assumed by his son Walter and three grandsons. The building was sold at a court-ordered auction in 1904 to resolve disputes raised by Abell's daughters. After no bids were made, the building was sold to American Bank.

The nine-story building was served by steam elevators, which were replaced by hydraulics in 1909, and electric elevators in 1922. It was altered, in 1904 by B. Stanley Simmons for the American Bank. In 1907, the ninth story was added as the Interstate Commerce Commission Hearing Room.

In 1942, the tower's spire was donated to support the war effort and in 1950, the tower atop the building was condemned.

Tenants included the Interstate Commerce Commission, Woodrow Wilson's law firm, Daniel C. Roper, and the Federal Bureau of Investigation.

The Sun Building was restored in 1983 by architects Abel & Weinstein. It was added to the National Register of Historic Places on March 27, 1985. Its 2009 property value is $13,931,970.

== See also ==
- Early skyscrapers
- National Register of Historic Places listings in the District of Columbia
