= Amy Weinstein =

American architect

Amy Weinstein is an American architect. Her work has gained attention for its attention to the visual appeal of faceted, polychrome detail while maintaining a modernist sensibility. Her buildings characteristically feature multicolored facades, elaborately worked railings, or bricks arranged in bold patterns.

She is known for her buildings in Washington, D.C., which are concentrated in the Capitol Hill neighborhood.

== Biography ==
Weinstein grew up in Somerset, Maryland. She earned her M.A. in architecture at the University of Pennsylvania. Her first professional job was as an architect was in Robert Venturi's firm. She next worked for the Washington D.C. firm Abel & Weinstein, where her architect father, Jesse Weinstein, was a partner.

She later joined the firm of her husband, architect Phil Esocoff. In October, 2015, the couple closed their boutique firm and joined the Washington office of the international design firm Gensler.

== Notable buildings ==
- Townhomes on Capitol Hill (Ellen Wilson Dwellings), a mixed-income development replacing the abandoned Ellen Wilson public housing project, noted for its contextual echoing of the form and polychrome brick of the neighborhood's traditional town houses.
- 700 Penn, a mixed-use development on Pennsylvania Avenue in the Capitol Hill neighborhood, combining residential, office and retail use between 7th and 8th streets SE, and between Pennsylvania and C Street, SE.
- Hine Junior High School, 7th Street SE, Washington D.C.
