= Oscar Cox (lawyer) =

American lawyer and judge

Oscar Sydney Cox (December 3, 1905 – October 4, 1966) was an American lawyer and judge. Among other positions, he was General Counsel of both the Lend-Lease Administration and the Office of Emergency Management; Assistant Solicitor General of the United States; General Counsel, Foreign Economic Administration; and Deputy Administrator, Foreign Economic Administration.

== Biography ==
Cox attended Massachusetts Institute of Technology and earned two degrees from Yale University: a Bachelor of Philosophy (1927) and a Bachelor of Laws (1929). He was associated with the law firm Cadwalader, Wickersham & Taft in New York City. From 1934 to 1938, Cox served as assistant corporation counsel for taxes. In 1938, he left New York City for a post with the United States Department of the Treasury. In 1941, Cox was appointed general counsel of the Lend-Lease Administration and the Office for Emergency Management (1941-1943).

Cox was born on December 3, 1905, in Portland, Maine, to a Jewish family. His son, Warren J. Cox (born 1935) is a well-known architect. Cox died on October 4, 1966, in Washington, D. C.
