= Warren J. Cox =

American architect

Warren Jacob Cox is an American architect and a co-founder of Hartman-Cox Architects in Washington, DC in 1965. He is the son of Oscar S. Cox, a prominent Washington, D.C. lawyer from Portland, Maine and Louise Black Cox of Bryson City, North Carolina. His parents moved to Washington, D.C. from New York City in 1938.

== Early life and education ==
Warren Cox was born in New York City on August 28, 1935. He attended The Hill School and then Yale University where he graduated magna cum laude in 1957, played varsity tennis and won the History of Art Prize. In 1961 he received his Master of Architecture from the Yale University School of Architecture where he was Editor of Perspecta, the Yale Architecture Journal, and received the Henry Adams Prize. While at Yale, he worked two summers at the Milan, Italy architectural firm of BBPR.

== Career ==
Cox began his architectural career in 1961 as the technology editor at Architectural Forum in New York. In 1962 he moved back to Washington, DC, where he became a designer with the firm of Keyes, Lethbridge & Condon until he and George Hartman founded Hartman-Cox Architects in 1965. He retired from the firm in 2010.

Hartman-Cox Architects received the American Institute of Architects Architectural Firm Award, the highest award for a firm in the U.S. in 1988. Other firm awards include the Louis Sullivan Prize for work in Masonry (1972), the Arthur Ross Award from the Institute for Classical Architecture (2006), six American Institute of Architecture National Honor Awards and over 120 other national and local design awards. The firm's work has appeared in major architectural publications and is the subject of two monographs.

Cox's work includes the Brewer House, the Chapel at Mount Vernon College, the National Permanent Building, the addition to and renovations of the Folger Shakespeare Library, the Library and residence hall at the Georgetown University Law Center, the renovations of the National Archives and the Smithsonian Museum of American Art and National Portrait Gallery, the renovation of the concert hall at the Kennedy Center, the Addition to the Kennedy-Warren apartment building, and Sumner Square in Washington, D.C.

Projects outside of Washington include Alderman Special Collections Library, Monroe Hall and the Undergraduate Business School buildings at the University of Virginia, the library at Monticello in Virginia, the Case Western Reserve University Library in Cleveland Ohio, the addition to the Divinity School at Duke University, the addition to the Winterthur Museum in Delaware, the federal courthouse in Corpus Christi, Texas, the headquarters for the HEB Grocery Company in San Antonio, Texas and law school buildings or additions at the University of Connecticut, Washington University in St. Louis, the University of Michigan, the University of Alabama and Tulane University in New Orleans.

Cox is a Fellow of the American Institute of Architects and received the Centennial Award of the Washington Metropolitan Chapter of the American Institute of Architects in 2006. He has served on numerous architectural design awards juries and lectured extensively throughout the country. He has taught at The Catholic University of America, the University of Virginia and at Yale University. He edited the Guide to the Architecture of Washington, D.C. in 1965.
