= Berla & Abel =

American architectural firm (1941 to 1996)

Berla & Abel Berla, Abel & Weinstein Abel & Weinstein

Practice information
- Partners: Julian E. Berla; Joseph H. Abel; Jesse Weinstein
- Founders: Julian E. Berla; Joseph H. Abel
- Founded: 1941
- Dissolved: 1996
- Location: Washington, D.C. Chevy Chase, Maryland

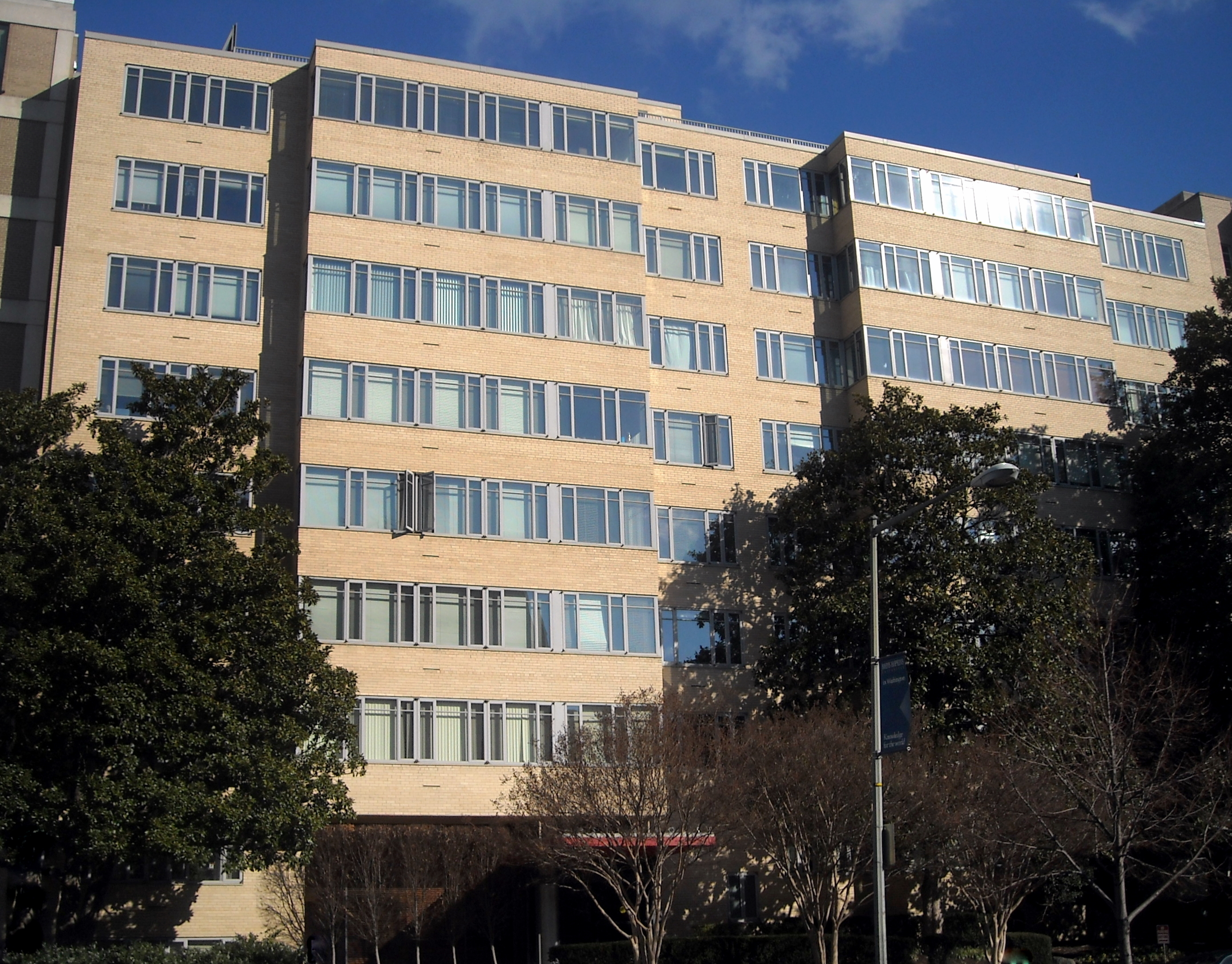
Boston House in Washington, D.C., designed by Berla & Abel and completed in 1950.

Berla & Abel, later known as Berla, Abel & Weinstein and Abel & Weinstein, was an American architectural firm active in Washington, D.C. from 1941 to 1996. The named partners were Julian E. Berla FAIA (April 7, 1902 – February 16, 1976), Joseph H. Abel FAIA (May 20, 1905 – November 25, 1985) and Jesse Weinstein AIA (May 20, 1919 – November 17, 2007). Berla and Abel were major figures in the introduction of modern architecture to Washington.

== History ==
Berla & Abel was formed in 1941 as the merger of the practices of architects Julian E. Berla and Joseph H. Abel, who had been in private practice in Washington since 1937 and 1932, respectively. Both had focused on the design of apartment buildings.

Building upon their previous experience, Berla & Abel developed a busy practice based on the design of large apartment buildings. As the public face of the firm, Berla was an uncompromising advocate for modern architecture and the partners were financially rewarded for it as their expertise placed them in an enviable position in the immediate post-World War II population boom, which necessitated extensive housing construction. Their reputation as uncompromising modernists attracted a number of young architects to the firm, including Arthur H. Keyes, Francis D. Lethbridge, Nicholas Satterlee and Chloethiel Woodard Smith. In 1951 these established their own firm, Keyes, Smith, Satterlee & Lethbridge. This firm and its two successors, led by Keyes and Smith, became Berla & Abel's most successful competitors in the ensuing decades. Their departure left an opening for another senior employee, Jesse Weinstein, who was made an associate in 1947 and a partner in 1963. In 1969, as Berla approached retirement, the firm was renamed Berla, Abel & Weinstein to reflect Weinstein's growing role. Berla retired from the partnership in 1971, followed by Abel in 1974. Weinstein continued the firm under the name of Abel & Weinstein in Washington until 1977 and in Chevy Chase until the firm's dissolution in 1996. Though the firm's influence began to wane in the 1960s, they continued to be considered for major projects into the 1980s. Later employees included Weinstein's daughter, architect Amy Weinstein, who was later credited by local architectural historian G. Martin Moeller Jr. with the reintroduction of polychromy into Washington architecture in the 1980s.

Berla & Abel's works comprised some of the largest privately owned buildings in the Washington area at the time. Their Bender Building (1959) was at the time of construction the largest private office building in Washington, and the Rosslyn Metro Center (1979) held the same distinction in Arlington. Their James Apartments (1960) had the city's first rooftop pool and the Towers (1960) still includes the city's largest penthouse apartment.

== Partner biographies ==
=== Julian E. Berla ===
Julian Emerson Berla FAIA (April 7, 1902 – February 16, 1976) was born in Newark, New Jersey. He was educated in the Newark public schools and at the Massachusetts Institute of Technology, graduating with an SB in architecture in 1923. He worked for New York City architects Edward S. Hewitt, Goodhue Associates and Mayers Murray & Phillip until opening his own office in 1930. In 1935 he joined the Resettlement Administration as an architect, and in 1937 himself settled in Washington, D.C., where he formed the firm of Kastner & Berla with Alfred Kastner. Kastner brought to the partnership an expertise in public housing, having collaborated with architects like Oscar Stonorov and Louis Kahn on projects including the Carl Mackley Houses (1935). This partnership was dissolved in 1939. During these first few years in Washington Berla continued his work for the federal government, working as a consulting architect to the United States Department of Commerce from 1937 to 1939 and to the United States Housing Authority from 1938 to 1940.

=== Joseph H. Abel ===
Joseph Henry Abel FAIA (May 20, 1905 – November 25, 1985) was born in Washington, D.C. He attended the Washington public schools before joining the office of architect George T. Santmyers in 1923. In 1928 he became the in-house architect for developer Harry M. Bralove, and in this capacity designed projects including the Omni Shoreham Hotel (1930). During his employment with Bralove Abel studied nights as George Washington University and was awarded a BArch in 1932. After graduation he formed the firm of Dillon & Abel with Charles E. Dillon, a former coworker from Santmyers' office. With their Governor Shepherd Apartments (1938, demolished), Dillon & Abel introduced the International Style to Washington. Dillon died in 1939 and Abel continued alone.

=== Jesse Weinstein ===
Jesse Weinstein AIA (May 20, 1919 – November 17, 2007) was born in Baltimore. He was educated at the Catholic University of America, graduating with a BS in architectural engineering in 1940. He worked first for Alfred Kastner before joining Berla in 1941. During World War II he served in the United States Air Force before returning to Berla & Abel in 1946.

== Architectural works ==
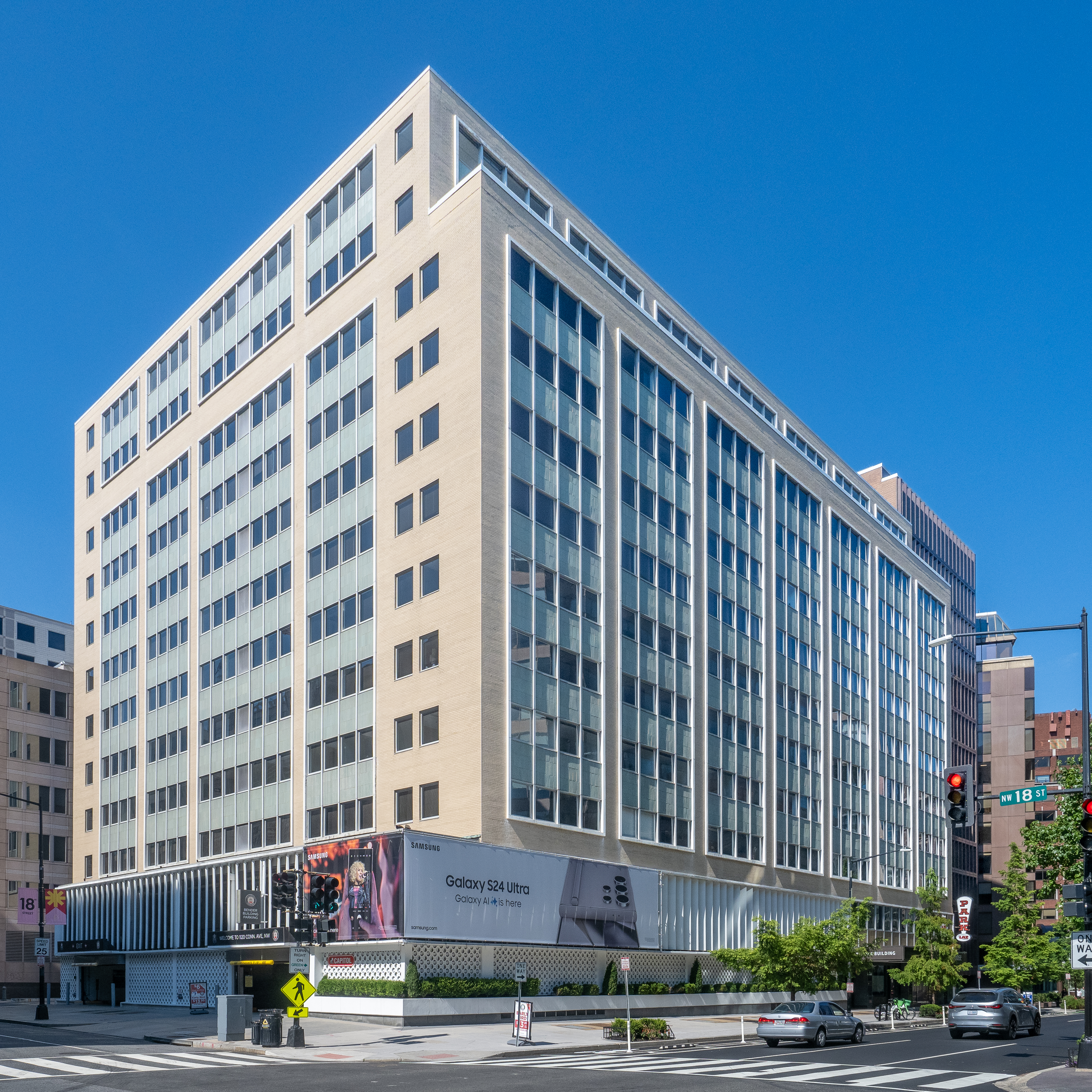
The Bender Building in Washington, D.C., designed by Berla & Abel and completed in 1959.

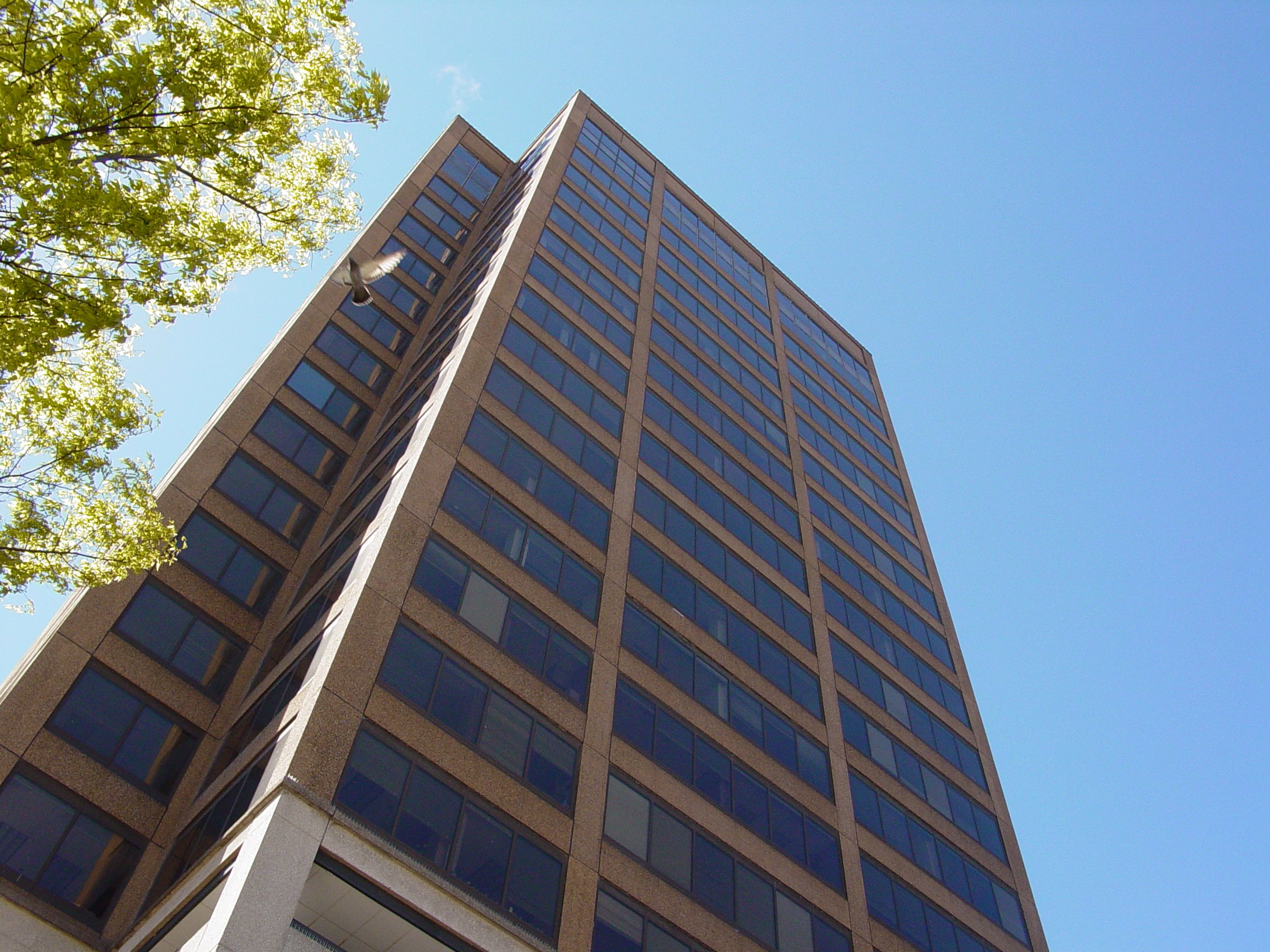
Rosslyn Metro Center in Arlington, Virginia, designed by Abel & Weinstein and completed in 1979.

- 1940 – Apartment building, 2720 Wisconsin Ave NW, Washington, D.C.
- 1941 – Apartment building, 2100 Connecticut Ave NW, Washington, D.C.
- 1941 – The Croydon, 1815 17th St NW, Washington, D.C.
- 1941 – Washington House, 2120 16th St NW, Washington, D.C.
- 1942 – Highview Towers, 2700 Wisconsin Ave NW, Washington, D.C.
- 1942 – Sherry Hall, 2702 Wisconsin Ave NW, Washington, D.C.
- 1950 – Boston House, 1711 Massachusetts Ave NW, Washington, D.C.
- 1950 – Crestview Apartments, 3601 Wisconsin Ave NW, Washington, D.C.
- 1951 – Crestwood Apartments, 3900 16th St NW, Washington, D.C.
- 1956 – The Essex, 4740 Connecticut Ave NW, Washington, D.C.
- 1957 – The Rittenhouse, 6101 16th St NW, Washington, D.C.
- 1959 – Bender Building, 1120 Connecticut Ave NW, Washington, D.C.
- 1960 – The Towers, 4201 Cathedral Ave NW, Washington, DC
- 1961 – James Apartments, 1425 N St NW, Washington, D.C.
- 1963 – The Apolline, 1330 New Hampshire Ave NW, Washington, D.C.
- 1964 – Farragut Building, 900 17th St NW, Washington, D.C.
- 1965 – Indiana Building, 633 Indiana Ave NW, Washington, D.C.
- 1965 – Linden Hill, 5450 Whitley Park Terrace, Bethesda, Maryland
- 1966 – Willard Towers, 1701 Willard Ave, Chevy Chase, Maryland
- 1967 – Highland House Apartments, 5480 Wisconsin Ave, Chevy Chase, Maryland
- 1969 – Parkside Apartments, 1702 Summit Pl NW, Washington, D.C.
- 1970 – Chevy Chase Building, 5530 Wisconsin Ave, Chevy Chase, Maryland
- 1970 – Van Ness Center, 4301 Connecticut Ave NW, Washington, D.C.
- 1972 – Rock Creek Terrace, 12630 Veirs Mill Rd, Rockville, Maryland
- 1977 – Regency at McLean, 1800 Old Meadow Rd, McLean, Virginia
- 1979 – Rosslyn Metro Center, 1700 N Moore St, Arlington, Virginia
- 1983 – Sun Building restoration, 1317 F St NW, Washington, D.C.
- 1987 – Silver Spring Centre, 8455 Colesville Rd, Silver Spring, Maryland

== See also ==
- "A portfolio of work by Berla & Abel" in Architectural Forum 85, no. 2 (August, 1946): 81–96.
- Joseph H. Abel and Fred Severud, Apartment Houses (New York: Reinhold Publishing Corporation, 1947)
