= Embassy of the United States, Asunción =

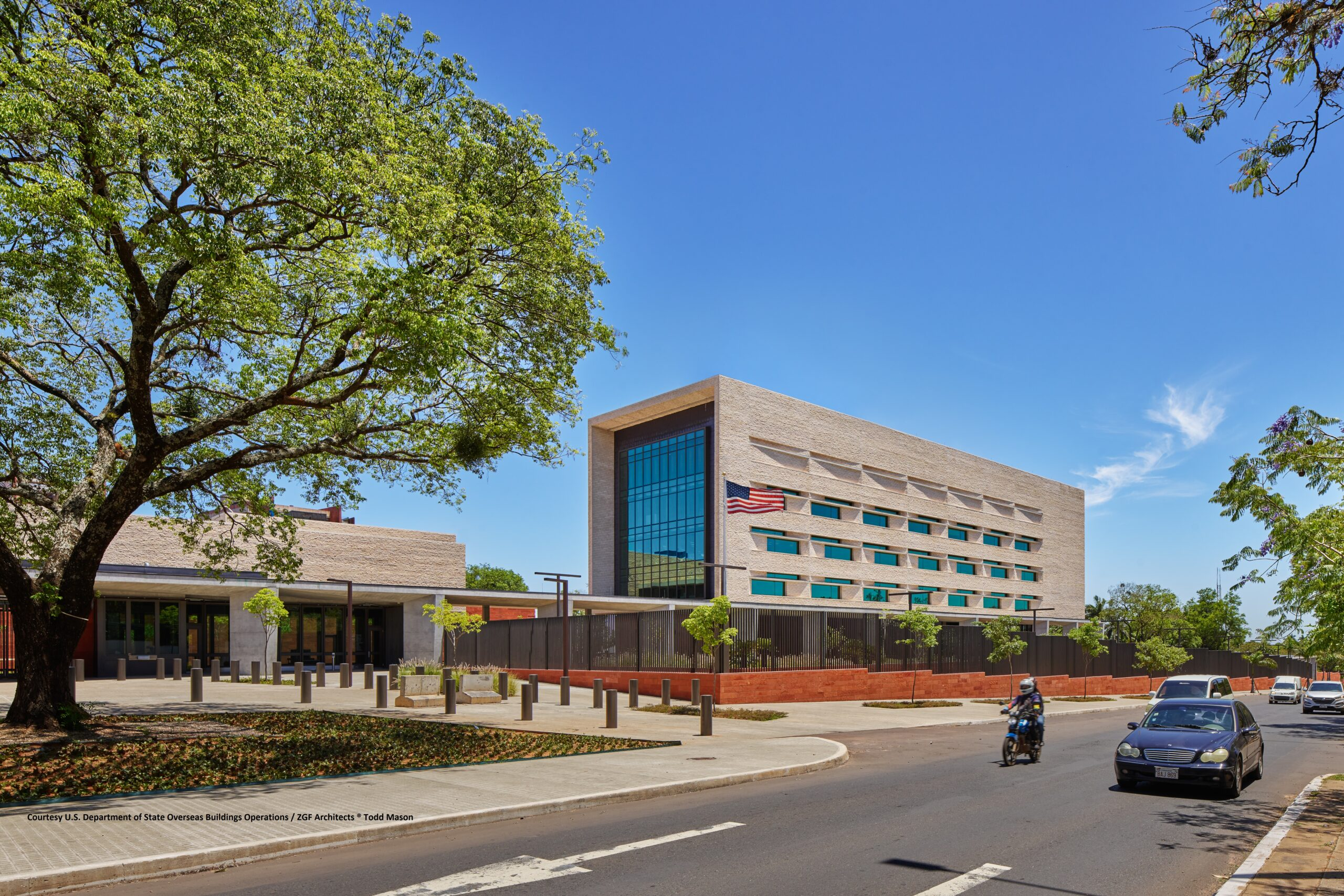
- The Embassy complex in late 2022
- Location: Asunción, Paraguay
- Address: Avda Mcal Lopez, Asunción, Paraguay
- Coordinates: 25°17′35″S 57°36′14″W
- Website: https://py.usembassy.gov

The Embassy of the United States in Asunción is the diplomatic mission of the United States in Paraguay, located in Asunción.

Diplomatic relations between Paraguay and the United States were formally established in 1861. On January 4, 1942, the two countries announced the elevation of their legations to the status of embassy. This took effect on March 31, 1942, with Señor Dr. Don Celso R. Velazquez presenting his credentials as Ambassador of Paraguay to the U.S. and Wesley Frost being promoted and presenting his credentials as U.S. Ambassador to Paraguay on April 15, 1942. Between 1955 and 1957, a new embassy was constructed based on the design of Chloethiel Woodard Smith, the only female architect to participate in the US State Department's embassy redesign program, which employed rising stars of architecture to symbolize the country's commitment to individual expression.

The construction of the current embassy building began in 2017, on the site of the existing building—14 acres (5.7 ha) of land at the intersection of Mariscal López and Juscelino Kubitschek avenues. It was designed by the American architectural firm Zimmer Gunsul Frasca Partnership. It was opened on June 29, 2023. The new embassy building has elements of sustainable architecture, such as a rain collection system which covers the totality of the embassy's irrigation needs.

== See also ==
- Embassy of Paraguay, Washington, D.C.
- List of ambassadors of the United States to Paraguay
- Paraguay–United States relations
