= Chloethiel Woodard Smith =

American architect

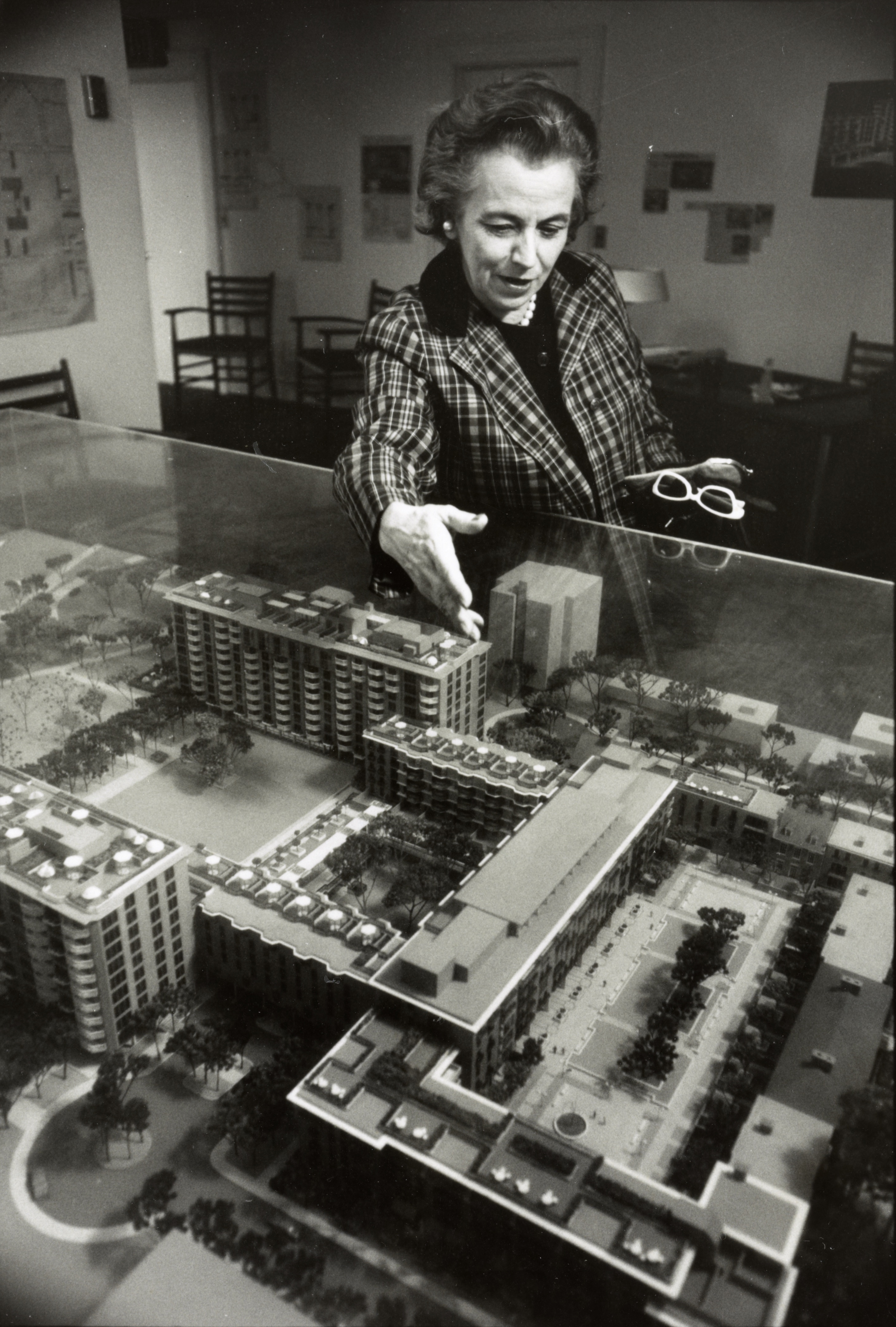
- Chloethiel Woodard Smith discussing her Harbour Square project, c. 1960
- Born: 1910; Peoria, Illinois, U.S.
- Died: December 30, 1992; Washington, D.C., U.S.
- Education: University of Oregon
- Occupation: Architect
- Projects: Reston, Virginia

Chloethiel Woodard Smith, FAIA (February 2, 1910 – December 30, 1992) was an American modernist architect and urban planner whose career was centered in Washington, D.C. She was the sixth woman inaugurated into the American Institute of Architects College of Fellows and at the peak of her practice led the country's largest woman-owned architecture firm.

== Career ==
Smith earned her undergraduate degree in architecture from the University of Oregon in 1932 and a master's degree in architecture from Washington University in St. Louis in 1933. Early in her career, Smith worked for the Federal Housing Authority and in the 1940s for Berla & Abel. She was a professor of architecture at the university de San Andres in La Paz, Bolivia, from 1942 to 1944. She formed Keyes, Smith, Satterlee & Lethbridge in 1951, and from 1963 to 1983 she practiced in her own firm, Chloethiel Woodard Smith & Associates.

Smith was responsible for significant project commissions and was selected to serve on various committees that influenced the shaping of post-World War II Washington, D.C. In 1952, with Louis Justement, she developed plans for the redevelopment of Washington's Southwest quadrant. She completed several projects in the redevelopment, including Capitol Park, Harbour Square, and Waterside Mall, and developed a proposal for a bridge with shops and restaurants spanning the Washington Channel that was inspired by the Ponte Vecchio in Florence, Italy. She also designed the National Airport Metro station and the Waterview Townhouses in Reston, Virginia—some of which have spiral steps that descend into a lake—and the Coleson Townhouses, 45 units in a woodland setting, also in Reston. At a key intersection in downtown Washington—the corner of Connecticut Avenue and L Street, N.W.—Smith designed three of the four office buildings there; architects and critics have referred to the intersection as "Chloethiel's Corner." Overseas, she designed the U.S. Embassy in Paraguay and developed a master plan for Quito, Ecuador.

Smith was influential in proposing a national museum celebrating buildings and architecture and successfully proposed the renovation of the Pension Building to serve as home to the National Building Museum. She was a trustee of the museum and served on various boards and commissions, including the Kennedy Center for the Performing Arts, the President's Council on Pennsylvania Avenue, the National Commission on Urban Problems, and the Committee of 100 on the Federal City. She was a member of the U.S. Commission of Fine Arts from 1967 to 1976.

By 1967, Smith ran Chloethiel Woodard Smith & Associates, which by 1971 became the largest female-run architectural firm in the United States; at the end of her career in the late 1980s, nearly 30% of architects working in Washington, D.C. had come through her office. The percentage would be much higher if the firms that she was a partner in are included. Notable architects Arthur Cotton Moore and Hugh Newell Jacobsen worked for her.

== Death and legacy ==
Chloethiel Woodard Smith died of cancer on December 30, 1992, at Hampton Regional Medical Center, a hospital located in Hampton, South Carolina. She was 82.

Smith was offended all of her life by the term "woman architect", having felt it demeaned her work and ability as an architect. When realizing the term fell into disuse, she stubbornly refused to be a part of any women's group. Her rise to the upper echelon of the profession had preceded the women's rights movement. Her name is not as well known by the general public as those of her contemporaries, yet she is considered to be a master whose successful career spanned five decades.

== Awards ==
Smith was named a Guggenheim Fellow in 1944. In 1960, she was inducted as a Fellow into the American Institute of Architects, the sixth woman so honored.

In 1989, the Washington chapter of the American Institute of Architects awarded her its Centennial Award for "continuous service to the chapter, the community and the profession."

== Selected works ==
- Miller Residence, Rockville, Maryland, 1947–48
- American Embassy, chancery and residence, Asunción, Paraguay, 1955–59
- Chestnut Lodge Mental Hospital and Research Institute, Rockville, Maryland, 1955–75
- Capitol Park Apartments and Townhouses (since 2006 Potomac Place Tower), Southwest, Washington, D.C., 1958–68
- Washington Channel Waterfront Master Plan, Washington, D.C., 1960–62
- Brook House, Brookline, Massachusetts, 1961–62
- Harcourt, Brace, and World, Inc., bookstore and executive offices, New York City, 1962–68
- E Street Expressway, 23rd to 19th Avenues, Washington, D.C., 1962
- Crown Tower, New Haven, Connecticut, 1962
- Laclede Town, St. Louis, Missouri, 1962–65
- Waterview Townhouses, Reston, Virginia, 1962–65
- Onondaga Lake Master Plan, Onondaga County, New York, 1964
- Shaw School, Washington, D.C., 1964
- 1100 Connecticut Avenue, office building, Washington, D.C., 1964–66
- Blake Building, 1025 Connecticut Avenue, Washington, D.C., 1964–66
- Waterside – Town Center, Washington, D.C., 1964–71
- Washington Channel Bridge (Ponte Vecchio), shopping bridge, Washington, D.C., 1965–68
- Skyline Study, Washington, D.C., 1965
- St. Andrews Episcopal Church, College Park, Maryland, 1965
- Mississippi Delta Feasibility Study, 1965
- F Street Plaza, Washington, D.C., 1965–66
- Harbour Square Apartments and Townhouses, Washington, D.C., 1965–67

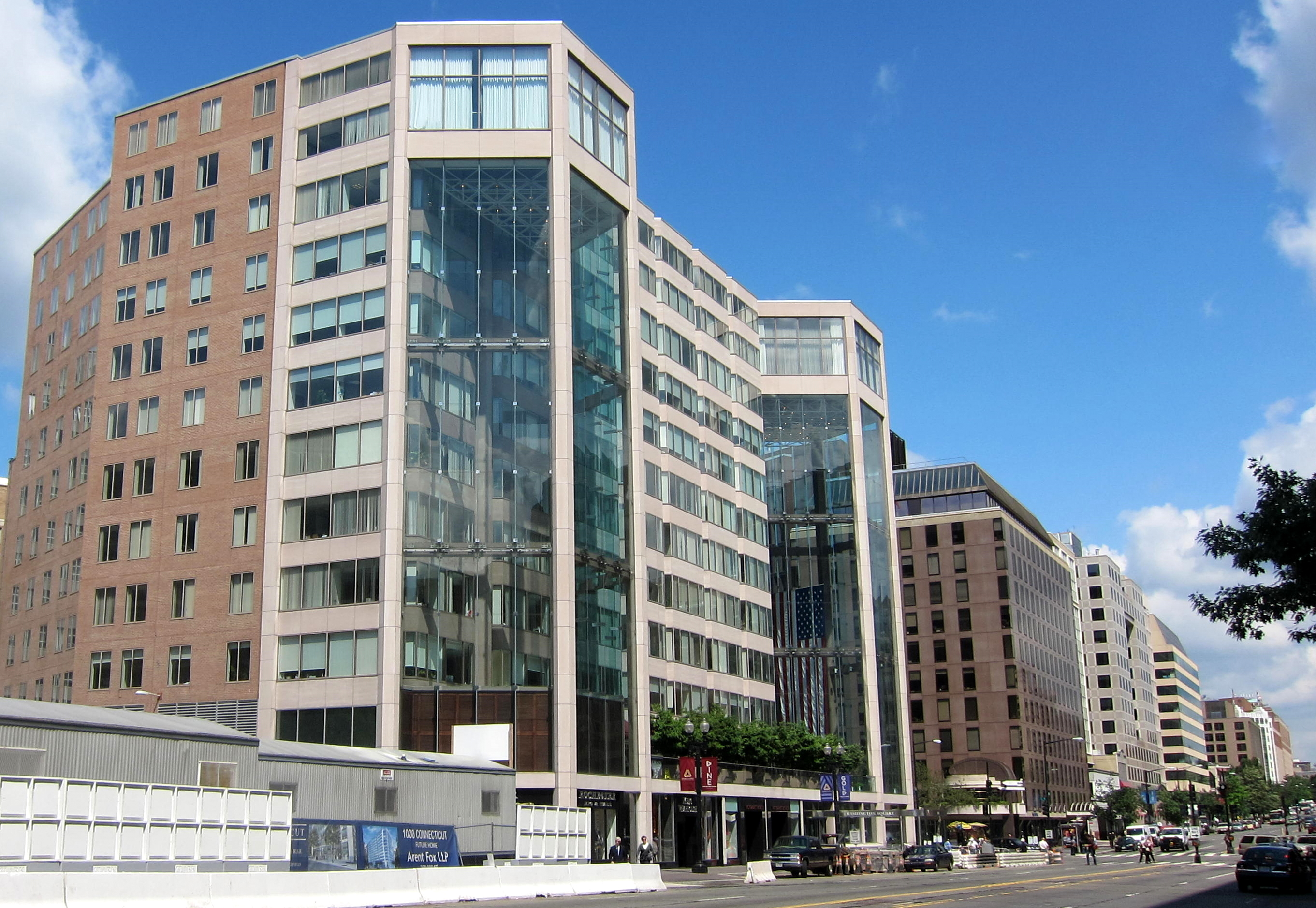
Washington Square on Connecticut Avenue in Washington, D.C.

- Pension Building, New Use Study, Washington, D.C., 1966
- Spa Creek, Townhouse group, Annapolis, Maryland, 1966
- Coleson Townhouses, Reston, Virginia, 1966–67
- Averne, Master Plan for Seven Towns on the Oceanfront, Borough of Queens, New York, 1967
- Wilde Lake High Rise, Columbia, Maryland, 1969
- Consolidated Federal Law Enforcement Training, Beltsville, Maryland, 1969–70
- Universalist Church, Rochester, New York, 1970
- Intown, Rochester, New York, 1970–71
- National Airport Metro station (since 2001 Ronald Reagan Washington National Airport Station), Arlington County, Virginia, 1971
- D.C. Association for Retarded Children, Occupational Training Center, Washington, D.C., 1973
- Washington Square, Washington, D.C., 1987–88

== Selected articles ==
- "She Makes the City a Place for Living." Business Week, June 3, 1967, 76–80.
- McLendon, Winzola. "Architect Designs No Ivory Towers." The Washington Post, July 30, 1967, E1, E5.
- Bailey, Anthony. "Profiles: Through the Great City III." The New Yorker, August 1967, 59–63.
- Von Eckardt, Wolf. "That Exceptional One." The Washingtonian, September 1988, 79–80.
- Forgey, Benjamin. "On Chloethiel's Corner." The Washington Post, January 1, 1993, D1, D8.
- Willis, Beverly, FAIA. "Tribute." National Building Museum Blueprints, no. XI (Spring 1993): 15.
