= Tiber Island Cooperative Homes =

Housing complex in Washington, D.C.

- Tiber Island
- U.S. National Register of Historic Places
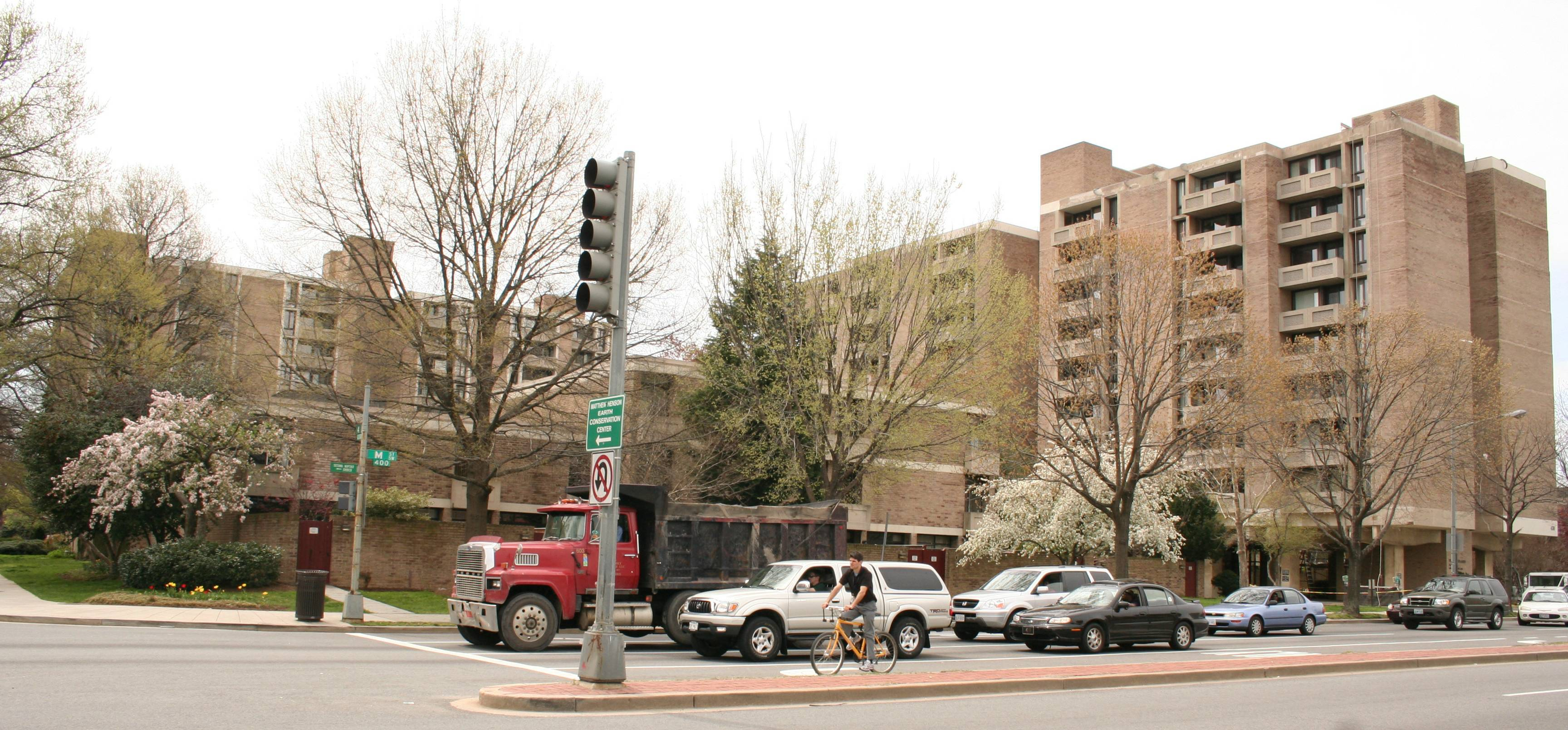

- Location within the District of Columbia Location within the United States
- Location: 401-461 N, 430-490 M, 1201-1265 4th & 1252 6th Sts., SW, Washington, District of Columbia
- Coordinates: 38.875334°N 77.018559°W
- Area: 8.4 acres (3.4 ha)
- Built: 1965
- Architect: Keyes, Lethbridge & Condon
- NRHP reference No.: 12001166
- Added to NRHP: January 14, 2013

Tiber Island Cooperative Homes is a housing complex in the Southwest portion of Washington DC. The 378 apartments in four nine-story towers and 21 townhouses were built in 1965 as part of a planned redevelopment of the area. The site was listed on the National Register of Historic Places in 2013 and contains the Thomas Law House, which is also listed.
