= New Mark Commons =

Historic district in Maryland, United States

- U.S. National Register of Historic Places
- U.S. Historic district
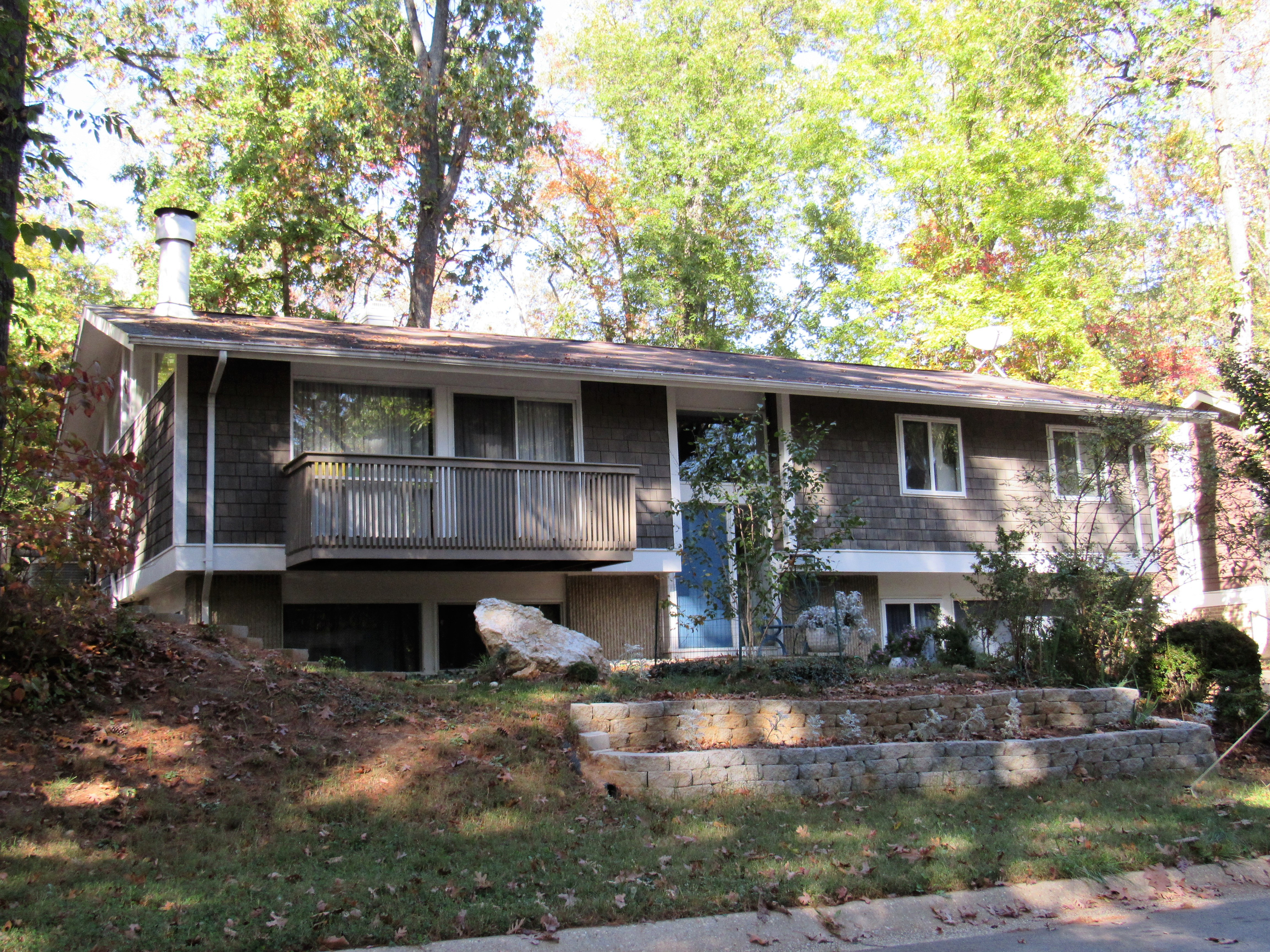

- Location within Maryland Location within the United States
- Location: Bounded by Maryland Ave., Argyle & Monroe Sts., Tower Oaks, I-270, Rockville, Maryland
- Coordinates: 39°4′33″N 77°9′34″W
- Area: 96.4 acres (39.0 ha)
- Built: 1967
- Built by: Bennett, Edmund
- Architect: Keyes, Lethbridge & Condon
- Architectural style: Modern Movement
- NRHP reference No.: 16000869
- Added to NRHP: August 1, 2017

New Mark Commons is a historic planned development in Rockville, Maryland. It consists of a residential area south of Maryland Avenue and east of Interstate 270, and is accessed via Potomac Valley Road and New Mark Esplanade. It was planned and built as a collaborative effort by the architectural firm Keyes, Lethbridge & Condon and builder Edmund J. Bennett, and was built between 1967 and 1973. Its design includes winding roads in a wooded landscape, with many cul-de-sacs, and pedestrian paths for connecting residential areas to recreational amenities.

The district was listed on the National Register of Historic Places in 2017.
