= Carderock Springs Historic District =

Historic district in Maryland, United States

- U.S. National Register of Historic Places
- U.S. Historic district
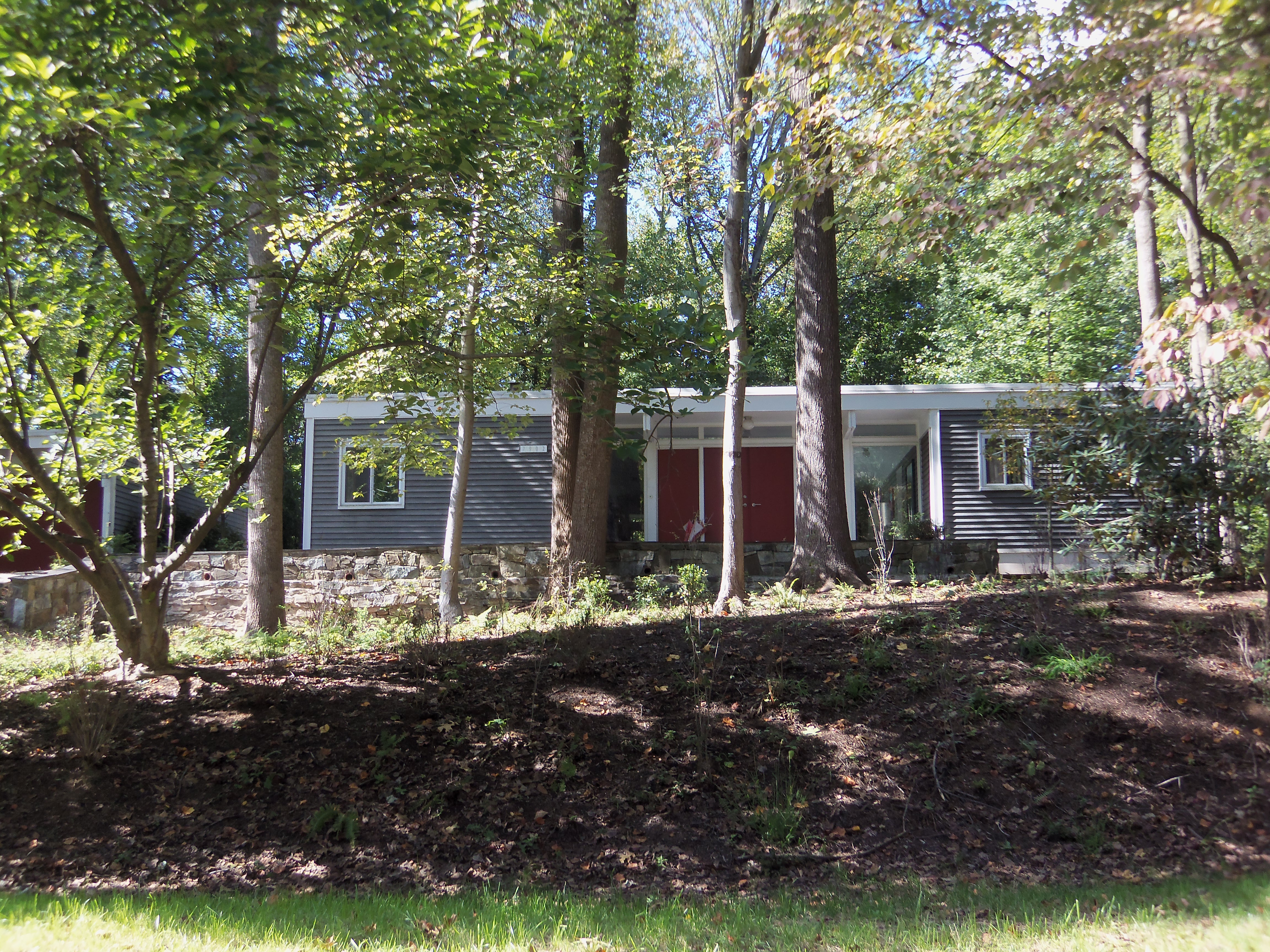
- House in Carderock Springs Historic District, September 2012

- Location within Maryland Location within the United States
- Location: Roughly bounded by 1-495, Cabin John Regional Park, Seven Locks Rd., Fenway Rd., and Persimmon Tree Ln., Bethesda, Maryland
- Coordinates: 38°59′20″N 77°10′3″W
- Area: 146 acres (59 ha)
- Built: 1962
- Built by: Bennett, Edmund
- Architect: Keyes, Lethbridge & Condon
- Architectural style: Modern Movement
- MPS: Subdivisions by Edmund Bennett and Keyes, Lethbridge and Condon in Montgomery County, MD, 1956-1973, MPS
- NRHP reference No.: 08001074
- Added to NRHP: November 21, 2008

Carderock Springs Historic District is a national historic district located at Bethesda, Montgomery County, Maryland. The district encompasses 275 modernist houses located northwest of Bethesda. It was developed between 1962 and 1966, and was planned to take full advantage of the existing landscape and topography, with curvilinear streets and cul-de-sacs serving wooded, sloping properties.

It was listed on the National Register of Historic Places in 2008.
