= Hugh Newell Jacobsen =

American architect (1929–2021)

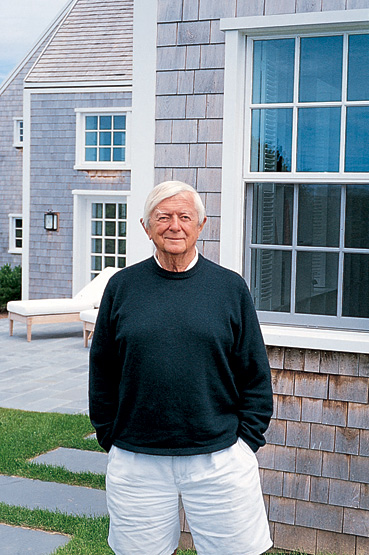
- Born: March 11, 1929; Grand Rapids, Michigan, U.S.
- Died: March 4, 2021 (aged 91); Front Royal, Virginia, U.S.
- Occupation: Architect
- Buildings: Beech House, 1963; University of Michigan Alumni Center, 1982; Buckwalter House, 1982; Addition to the United States Capitol, 1993
- Projects: The Weitzenhoffer Wing of the Fred Jones Art Center, University of Oklahoma.

Hugh Newell Jacobsen (March 11, 1929 – March 4, 2021) was an American architect. He was noted for designing Jacqueline Kennedy Onassis' home in Martha's Vineyard during the 1980s. He also restored part of the U.S. Embassy in Paris, as well as Spaso House in Moscow.

== Early life ==
Jacobsen was born on March 11, 1929, in Grand Rapids, Michigan, to Lucy Ellen (Newell) and John Edwall Jacobsen. His father was initially employed as a meat importer and later worked for the War Shipping Administration during World War II. Consequently, the Jacobsen family moved to Washington, D.C., and he graduated from Woodrow Wilson High School in 1947. Jacobsen went on to study fine arts at the University of Maryland, obtaining a bachelor's degree in 1951. Although he originally intended to become a portrait painter, his father advised him to go into architecture for its job security. Subsequently, he undertook postgraduate studies at Yale University, earning a Master of Architecture in 1955.

After completing his formal education, Jacobsen briefly worked in New Canaan, Connecticut, apprenticing to Philip Johnson in 1955. Subsequently, he worked for Keyes, Lethbridge & Condon in Washington, D.C., from 1957 to 1958, and was also taught by Louis Kahn. Jacobsen opened his eponymous Georgetown architectural firm in 1958.

== Career ==
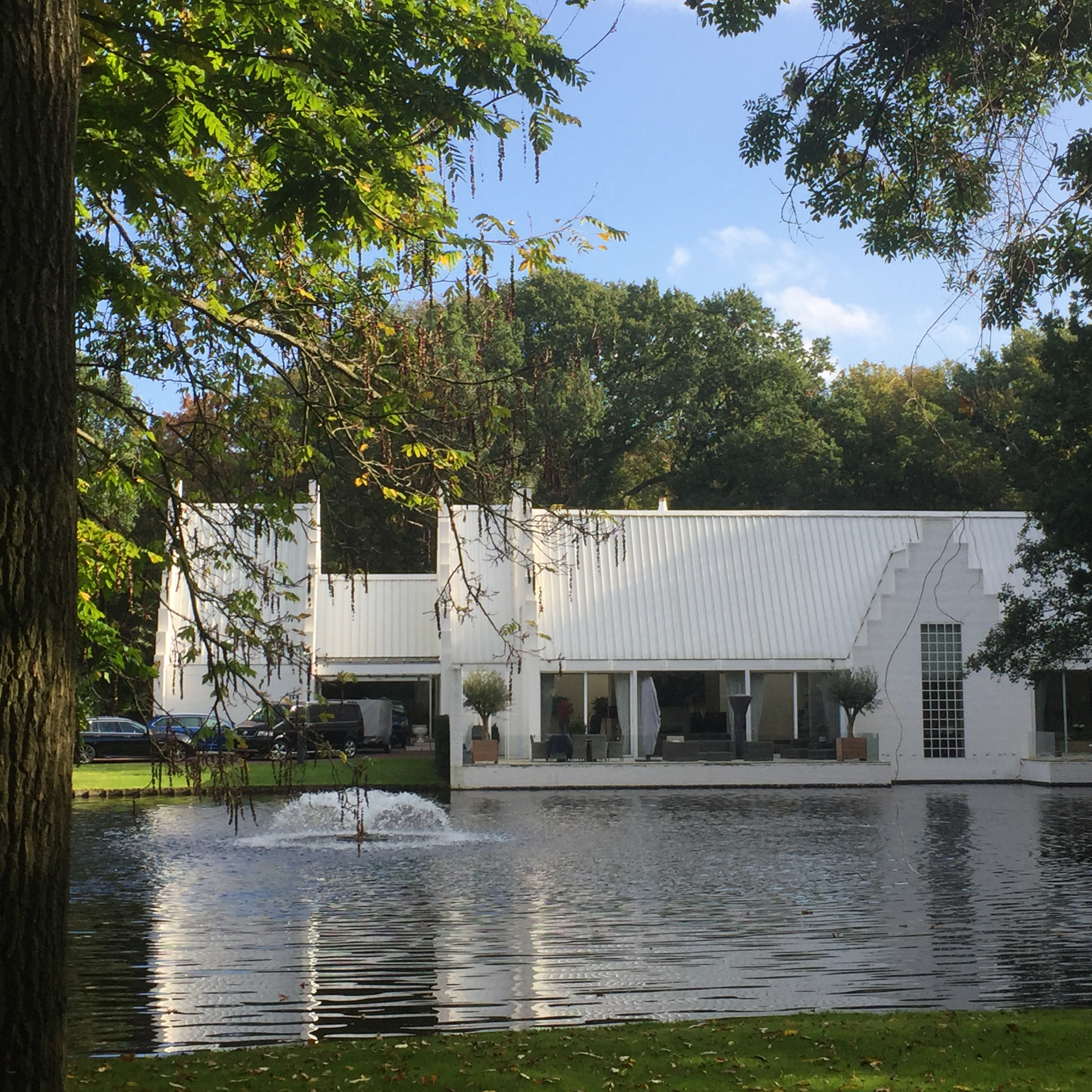
"White House" in Voorschoten (the Netherlands)

Jacobsen was widely known for his modern pavilion-based residences—composed of simple, gabled forms, rectangular in plan. Unlike other second-generation Modernist architects who revisited the iconic European houses of the 1920s or the American shingle style of the nineteenth century, Jacobsen drew inspiration from the vernacular architecture of the American homestead. His large but intimately scaled pavilions recall the barns, detached kitchens, and smokehouses—the outbuildings—of rural America.

Jacobsen designed Jacqueline Kennedy Onassis' home in Martha's Vineyard, which was completed in 1981. There was initially public outcry over concerns that his modern design would contrast jarringly with the adjacent historic cottages. However, the design was ultimately subtle, more akin to "New England saltbox than brutalist concrete fantasy". He was also commissioned by Meryl Streep, James Garner, and Rachel Lambert Mellon, among others.

Other well known works of Jacobsen include his addition under the West Terrace of the United States Capitol, as well as the restoration of the Renwick Gallery and Arts and Industries Building, all in Washington, D.C. He also refurbished the Hôtel de Talleyrand section of the U.S. Embassy in Paris and Spaso House in Moscow. He designed structures for universities such as Georgetown University, the University of Maryland (his alma mater), University of Michigan, and University of Oklahoma.

Jacobsen was elected into the National Academy of Design in 1988, first as an Associate member, before becoming a full Academician four years later. He was one of a small number of architects chosen in 1998 to participate in designed the Dream House series. This was promotion by Life magazine where famed architects designed homes, and plans were made publicly available. He ended up selling over 900,000 plans, and the houses built from them were constructed in countries such as Argentina, South Korea, and the United Kingdom.

== Personal life ==
Jacobsen was married to Ruth "Robin" Kearney until her death in 2010. Together, they had three children: John, Matthew, and Simon. He had dyslexia.

Jacobsen died on March 4, 2021, aged 91, at an assisted living facility in Front Royal, Virginia. Jacobsen's ashes were interred under a mirrored-clad mausoleum on his son's farm in Virginia.
