= Cedar Lane Unitarian Universalist Congregation =

- Cedar Lane Unitarian Universalist Congregation
- 39.01310°N 77.08945°W
- Location: Bethesda, Maryland
- Country: U.S.
- Denomination: Unitarian Universalism
- Website: www.cedarlane.org

History
- Status: Church
- Founded: 1951

Architecture
- Functional status: Active
- Architect: Pietro Belluschi

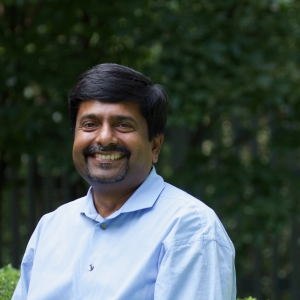
Rev. Abhi Janamanchi

Cedar Lane Unitarian Universalist Congregation is a Unitarian Universalist church located in Bethesda, Maryland. The congregation is active in community service and social justice projects. The church is officially a "Welcoming Congregation" (openly welcoming all sexual orientation and gender identities) following the guidelines of the Unitarian Universalist Association, of which it is a member. Cedar Lane has weekly Sunday services and offers religious education classes for young people during the school year. Cedar Lane changed its name by congregational vote in 2023 from Cedar Lane Unitarian Universalist Church to Cedar Lane Unitarian Universalist Congregation in an effort to be welcoming and inclusive to all religions.

== History ==
=== Origin ===
Cedar Lane Unitarian Universalist Congregation grew out of the All Souls Church located in Washington D.C. "All Souls" was founded in 1821 and began experiencing a record growth in the post-World War II era. under the leadership of Rev. A. Powell Davies, All Souls founded five new churches in the surrounding community, including Cedar Lane, which held its first service in September, 1951.

=== Building ===
The church was originally housed at the Chevy Chase Women's Club in Chevy Chase, Maryland, but was moved in 1955 after the church purchased new land in Bethesda, Maryland. Noted architect, Pietro Belluschi, was hired to design the church building for the site, which was dedicated in May, 1958. The building has been expanded over the years to allow for increased office and classroom space. The building has won several awards, including one from the American Association of Architects for its relationship with its natural surroundings. A 51 rank, four-manual pipe organ was constructed in the choir loft in 1987.

=== Early years ===
By 1962, Cedar Lane was the fourth-largest church in the denomination with 1,783 members. Cedar Lane worked to found two additional churches in the area, the Unitarian Universalist Congregation of Rockville and the River Road Unitarian Universalist Church, in 1956 and 1959 respectively.

=== Ministers ===
Cedar Lane has had 5 senior ministers over the years:

- John Baker (1953 to 1960)
- Robert Zoerheide (1961 to 1971)
- Kenneth Maclean (1972 to 1992 )
- Roger Fritts (1993 to 2011)
- Abhi Janamanchi (2013 to present)
- William R. Moors, Associate Minister (1965–1969)

=== Religious education ===
The "Our Whole Lives" (OWL) curriculum of sex-education for middle-schoolers was developed at Cedar Lane. Former Cedar Lane Minister of Religious Education, Rev. Roberta Nelson, famously defended the Unitarian-Universalists' proactive stance on church-based sex-education in a TV interview with Bryant Gumbel.

== Engagement ==
Cedar Lane's ministers and members have been involved in progressive liberal activism since its inception. The first Montgomery County (Maryland) chapter of Planned Parenthood began at the church. Cedar Lane was a founding congregation for Action in Montgomery, which has worked for fair housing policies, better medical care for low-income families and construction of numerous affordable housing units.

Cedar Lane has an active social justice ministry, focusing on immigrants and refugees, racism, the environment, and gender issues. The church is an accredited Green Sanctuary Congregation, as recognized by the Unitarian Universalists Association. The church achieved some notoriety for sheltering a Salvadoran immigrant facing deportation eighteen months after the congregation voted to become a sanctuary ministry.
