= Lewis House =

Lewis House may refer to:

== Australia ==
- Lewis House, listed on the State Register of Heritage Places in Cottesloe, Western Australia

== England ==
- C. S. Lewis House, in Oxford, known as The Kilns

== United States ==
(ordered by state and then city)

- Jay Lewis House, McGehee, Arkansas
- Lewis House (Lafayette, Colorado)
- Isaac C. Lewis Cottage, Branford, Connecticut
- Isaac Lewis House (Stratford, Connecticut)
- Lewis-Zukowski House, Suffield, Connecticut
- Jefferson Lewis House, Kenton, Delaware
- Edward Simon Lewis House
- Greene-Lewis House, Tallahassee, Florida
- Lewis House (Tallahassee, Florida)
- J. A. Lewis House, Clarkesville, Georgia, listed on the NRHP in Habersham County
- DeVaughn-Lewis House, Montezuma, Georgia, listed on the NRHP in Macon County
- Lewis Bungalow, Paris, Idaho
- Fred Lewis Cottage, Paris, Idaho
- Lloyd Lewis House, Libertyville, Illinois
- John W. Lewis House, Marshall, Illinois
- John L. Lewis House, Springfield, Illinois
- Thomas J. Lewis House, Roann, Indiana
- Woodson Lewis House, Greensburg, Kentucky, listed on the NRHP in Green County
- Dr. John Lewis House, St. Matthews, Kentucky
- Alpheus Lewis House (also known as the Oakwood Estate), Winchester, Kentucky, listed on the NRHP in Clark County
- Lewis Manor, Lexington, Kentucky, listed on the NRHP in Fayette County
- Booker-Lewis House, Leesville, Louisiana, listed on the NRHP in Vernon Parish
- John Lewis House (Opelousas, Louisiana), listed on the NRHP in St. Landry Parish
- Lewis House (Ruston, Louisiana)
- Lewis House (Shreveport, Louisiana), listed on the NRHP in Caddo Parish
- Lewis House (Reading, Massachusetts)
- Charles D. Lewis House, Sherborn, Massachusetts
- Deacon Willard Lewis House, Walpole, Massachusetts
- F.W. Lewis House, Midland, Michigan
- E. H. Lewis House, Chaska, Minnesota, listed on the NRHP in Carver County
- Lewis House and Medical Office, Henning, Minnesota
- Sinclair Lewis Boyhood Home, Sauk Centre, Minnesota
- Ervin Lewis House, Byram, Mississippi
- A.J. Lewis House, Edwards, Mississippi
- Colonel Alfred E. Lewis House, Gautier, Mississippi, listed on the NRHP in Jackson County
- Iva Lewis House, Grandin, Missouri
- Lewis-Webb House, Independence, Missouri, listed on the NRHP in Jackson County
- Lewis-Nevala Homestead, Belt, Montana, listed on the NRHP in Cascade County
- Samuel Lewis House (Bozeman, Montana)
- Lewis House (Lewistown, Montana), listed on the NRHP in Fergus County
- Lewis-Syford House, Lincoln, Nebraska
- Harry and Molly Lewis House, Beaver Falls, New York
- Palmer-Lewis Estate, Bedford, New York
- Lewis House (Cape Vincent, New York)
- Lewis-Thornburg Farm, Asheboro, North Carolina
- Lewis-Smith House, Raleigh, North Carolina
- Lewis House (Fargo, North Dakota), a Classical Revival house
- Samuel Lewis House (Mansfield, Ohio)
- Samuel Lewis Farmhouse, Radnor, Ohio, listed on the NRHP in Delaware County
- Dr. A.C. Lewis House, Winchester, Ohio, listed on the NRHP in Adams County
- Lewis-Shippy House, Dayton, Oregon, listed on the NRHP in Yamhill County
- William H. Lewis Model House, Portland, Oregon
- Evan Lewis House, Exton, Pennsylvania
- Lewis-Card-Perry House, Westerly, Rhode Island
- William Lewis House (Waxahachie, Texas)
- John S. and Izola Lewis House, Orem, Utah
- Dr. David and Juanita Lewis House, Salt Lake City, Utah, listed on the NRHP in Salt Lake County
- Lewis Farm
- Shumaker-Lewis House, Mason, West Virginia
- Lewis-Capehart-Roseberry House, Point Pleasant, West Virginia
- Lewis Farmhouse, Boardman, Wisconsin, listed on the NRHP in St. Croix County
- Gov. James T. Lewis House, Columbus, Wisconsin
- Lewis-Williams House, Hudson, Wisconsin
- Morey-Lewis House, Waukesha, Wisconsin, listed on the NRHP in Waukesha County
