= John Lewis House =

John Lewis House may mean:

- Dr. John Lewis House, listed on the National Register of Historic Places (NRHP) in St. Matthews, Kentucky
- John L. Lewis House, listed on the NRHP in Springfield, Illinois
- John W. Lewis House, listed on the NRHP in Marshall, Illinois
- John Lewis House (Opelousas, Louisiana), listed on the NRHP in Louisiana
- John C. and Augusta (Covell) Lewis House, listed on the NRHP in Whitehall, Michigan
- John S. and Izola Lewis House, NRHP in Orem, Utah

== See also ==
- Lewis House (disambiguation)
