= Isaac Lewis House =

Isaac Lewis House or Isaac Lewis Cottage may refer to:

- Isaac C. Lewis Cottage, listed on the National Register of Historic Places (NRHP) in Branford, Connecticut
- Isaac Lewis House (Stratford, Connecticut), listed on the NRHP in Stratford, Connecticut

== See also ==
- Lewis House (disambiguation)
