= Samuel Lewis House =

Lewis, Samuel, House can refer to:

- Samuel Lewis House (Bozeman, Montana), listed on the National Register of Historic Places (NRHP) in Montana
- Samuel Lewis House (Mansfield, Ohio), listed on the NRHP in Ohio
- Samuel Lewis Farmhouse, listed on the NRHP in Delaware County, Ohio
