= Wheat Row =

Historic houses in Washington, D.C., United States

- U.S. National Register of Historic Places
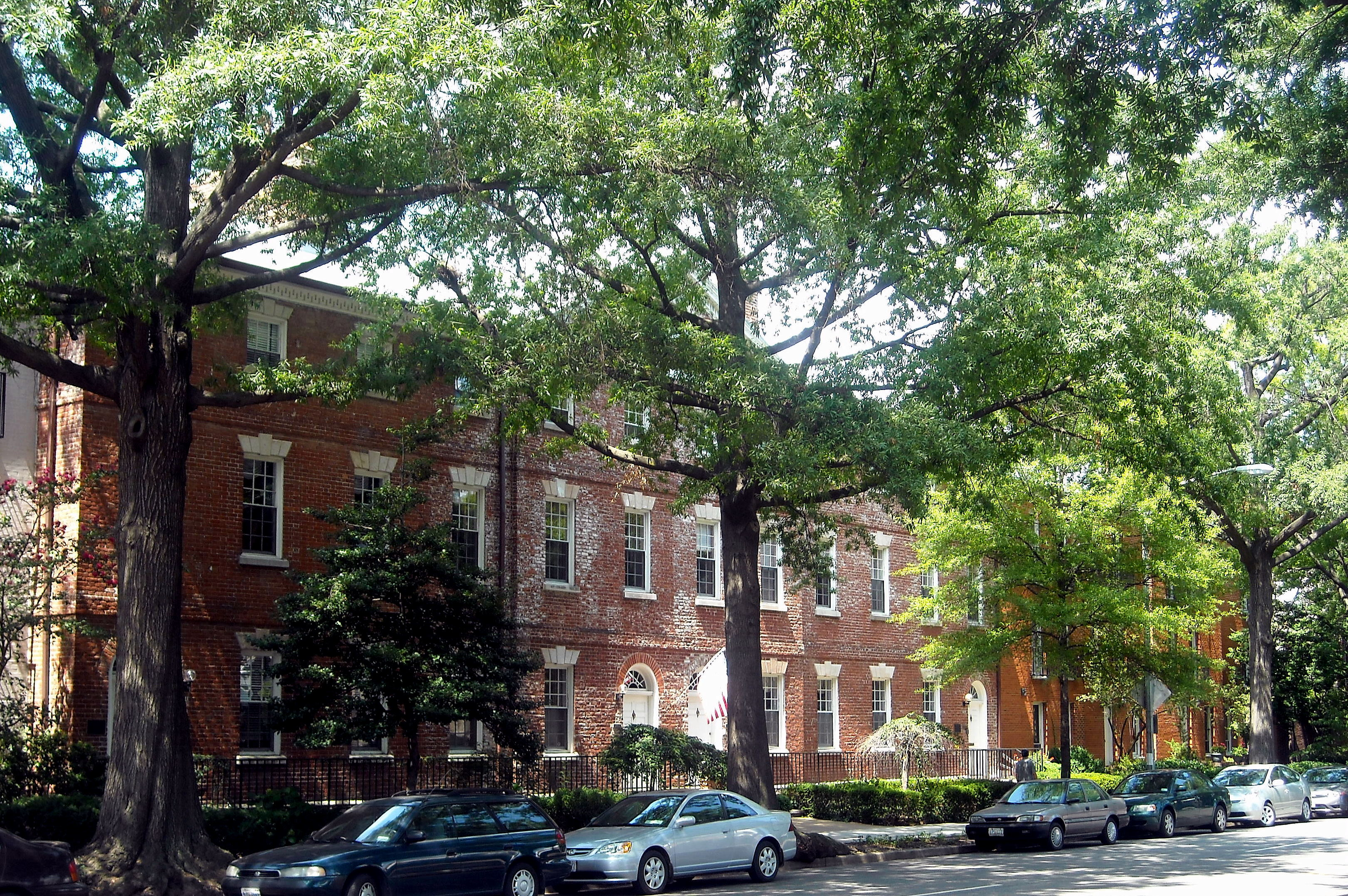
- Looking northwest at Wheat Row in 2008

- Location within Washington, D.C.
- Location: 1315, 1317, 1319, and 1321 4th Street, S.W. Washington, D.C.
- Coordinates: 38°52′26″N 77°1′5″W
- Built: 1794–1795
- Architect: William Lovering (attributed)
- Architectural style: Late Georgian
- NRHP reference No.: 73002125
- Added to NRHP: July 23, 1973

Wheat Row is a row of four Late Georgian style townhouses located at 1315, 1317, 1319, and 1321 4th Street SW in the Southwest Waterfront neighborhood of Washington, D.C., in the United States. Begun in 1794 and completed in 1795, the structures are some of the oldest residential homes in the District of Columbia. They served several uses in the early and mid 20th century, but were integrated into the Harbour Square cooperative in 1963. Wheat Row was added to the National Register of Historic Places on July 23, 1973.

== History ==
=== Construction ===
The Residence Act of 1790, which established the site for the capital of the United States, provided for the appointment of three commissioners by the President (and without the need for Senate confirmation) to govern the District of Columbia, survey its land, purchase property from private landowners, and construct federal buildings. James Greenleaf was a land speculator who arrived in the city on September 17, 1793. On either September 23, 1793, or December 24, 1793, Greenleaf purchased from the D.C. commissioners the land on which Wheat Row would be built. By the start of 1794, Greenleaf owned half the federal government's salable land in the District of Columbia.

Greenleaf began construction on the four townhouses which became Wheat Row in 1794. The builder was James Clark. Sources differ on the architect. Historian Bob Arnebeck argues it was Clark, but most sources attribute Wheat Row to the important local architect William Lovering.

Wheat Row was the first example in the District of Columbia of the terraced house (also known as the row house or townhouse). According to the National Capital Planning Commission, they are probably the first houses built after the District of Columbia was chosen as the seat of the federal government. The Thomas Law House and Duncanson-Cranch House, both nearby, were erected at about the same time by Greenleaf and his partners.

Wheat Row was not initially a successful development. The townhouses were considered small by the standards of the day, of an out-of-date architectural style, poorly constructed, and built with inferior materials. Greenleaf refused to pay for them, and Clark suffered a mental breakdown as a result of the business setbacks caused by Greenleaf's actions. (Note: Historian Arnebeck argues that Greenleaf's real reason for refusing payment was because his own company was close to bankruptcy.) Wheat Row remained incomplete at the end of 1794, and was not finished until the following year.

=== Occupants and uses ===
The earliest occupant of Wheat Row was William Prentiss, a surveyor who helped lay out housing plats in the District of Columbia in the 1790s. He married Marie Josephine Wilhelmina Matilda Greenleaf, daughter of James Greenleaf, and they took up residence on Wheat Row in 1796. (Note: William and Marie Prentiss' great-great-grandson was Charles Appleton Prentiss, a prominent D.C. attorney. Their great-great-great-grandson was Louis Watkins Prentiss, a major general in the United States Army Corps of Engineers.)

The Wheat Row name is derived from that of John Wheat, a prominent local designer of gardens and a messenger employed by the United States Congress. According to the earliest extant records, Wheat owned 1315 4th Street as early as 1819. 1317 4th Street was owned by Robert P. Washington, and 1319 4th Street by Richmond Johnson. 1321 4th Street was jointly owned by Thomas L. Washington and Philip Stuart. Stuart bought out Washington's interest by 1824, and purchased a share of 1319 4th Street from Johnson. By the time Wheat died in 1844, he had purchased 1319 and 1321 4th Street from Johnson and Stuart. He left all three row houses to his wife, Mary. Members of the Wheat family continued to own these houses until at least 1868.

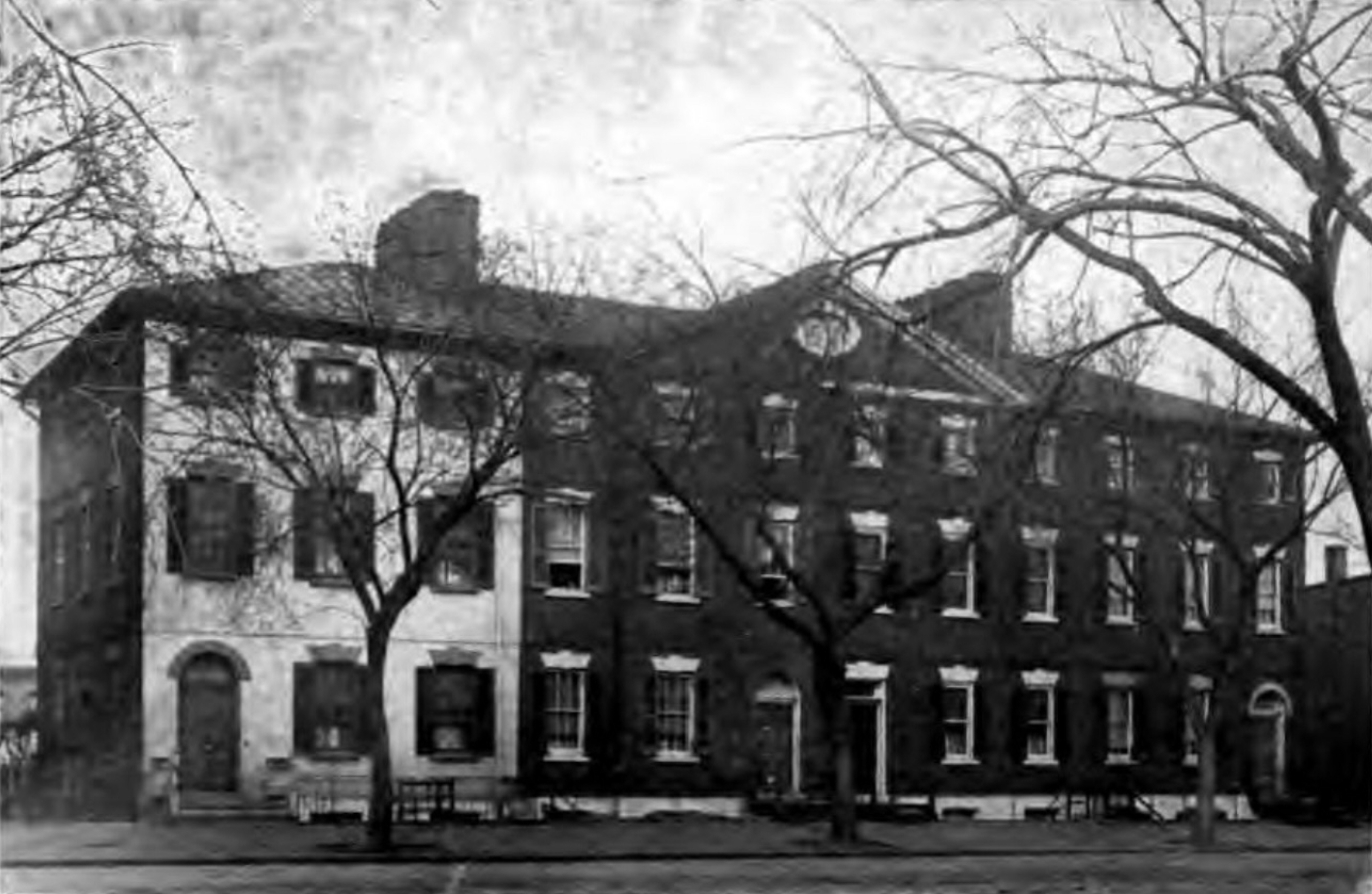
Wheat Row, photographed before 1901

The four row houses of Wheat Row were used for residences until 1939. (Note: J.D. Wilhelm, a truck driver and mechanic's assistant, lived at 1315 4th street SW in 1936. In 1937, the Reeder family lived at 1321 4th Street SW.) John Neligh, the director of industrial crafts at Barney Neighborhood House, owned 1315 4th Street. Barney Neighborhood House served as a home for poor women and worked to improve cultural awareness among the working class. Established in 1904, Barney Neighborhood House occupied the Duncanson-Cranch House. When Neligh died in 1939, he left his home to the Barney Neighborhood House, which renovated it and used it as a neighborhood art gallery known as Rhoads House. That same year, 1317 4th Street was purchased by the National Craft Training Center, a newly established organization which taught handicrafts to poor and working-class girls. By May 22, 1941, 1315 4th Street housed the Rhoads Service Men's Club, a service organization which provided free and reduced-cost entertainment to members of the United States military. In late 1941, Mary Adams purchased 1319 4th Street, renovated it, and donated it to the Barney Neighborhood House in memory of her mother. The organization used it as a day care facility, serving 30 children (double the capacity available in its old location). By 1950, Barney Neighborhood House had come into possession of 1317 4th Street.

1321 4th Street, however, remained in use as a residence, although by 1950 it had been subdivided internally into apartments.

=== Harbour Square ===
In the 1950s, Wheat Row was saved from demolition and incorporated into the Harbour Square development. Washington, D.C., had undergone rapid population growth during World War II. In 1946, the United States Congress passed the District of Columbia Redevelopment Act, which established the District of Columbia Redevelopment Land Agency (RLA) and provided legal authority to clear land and funds to spur redevelopment in the capital. Congress also gave the National Capital Planning Commission (NCPC) the authority to designate which land would be redeveloped, and how. The RLA was not funded, however, until passage of the Housing Act of 1949. A 1950 study by the NCPC found that the small Southwest quarter of the city suffered from high concentrations of old and poorly maintained buildings, overcrowding, and threats to public health (such as lack of running indoor water, sewage systems, electricity, central heating, and indoor toilets). Competing visions for the redevelopment ranged from renovation to wholesale leveling of neighborhoods, but the latter view prevailed as more likely to qualify for federal funding. Demolition faced almost all structures in Southwest Washington.

However, in December 1954, the Historical Society of Washington, D.C. successfully pressured the RLA into giving consideration to saving Wheat Row and the Duncanson-Cranch House. Then in September 1958, O. Roy Chalk, president of DC Transit, proposed integrating the Edward Simon Lewis House, Wheat Row, and the Duncanson-Cranch House into the new developments then on the drawing board. By January 1959, the RLA was actively pushing for all three properties, plus the Thomas Law House, to be saved and integrated into the new construction, even as housing and other buildings around them were being demolished. The RLA subsequently awarded development of the area around Wheat Row to Shannon and Luchs, a local real estate development firm. On June 3, 1960, Shannon and Luchs announced it would build a $12 million, 447-unit cooperative apartment complex known as Harbour Square on the Wheat Row site. Wheat Row, the Duncanson-Cranch House, and the Lewis House would be incorporated into the new development. Construction on the project, designed by the architectural firm of Satterlee & Smith and now including financial partner John McShain, began in February 1963. Wheat Row was integrated into Harbour Square as four of the 17 townhouses offered for sale by the cooperative. Harbour Square was completed in 1964.

Wheat Row remains part of Harbour Square.

== Architecture ==
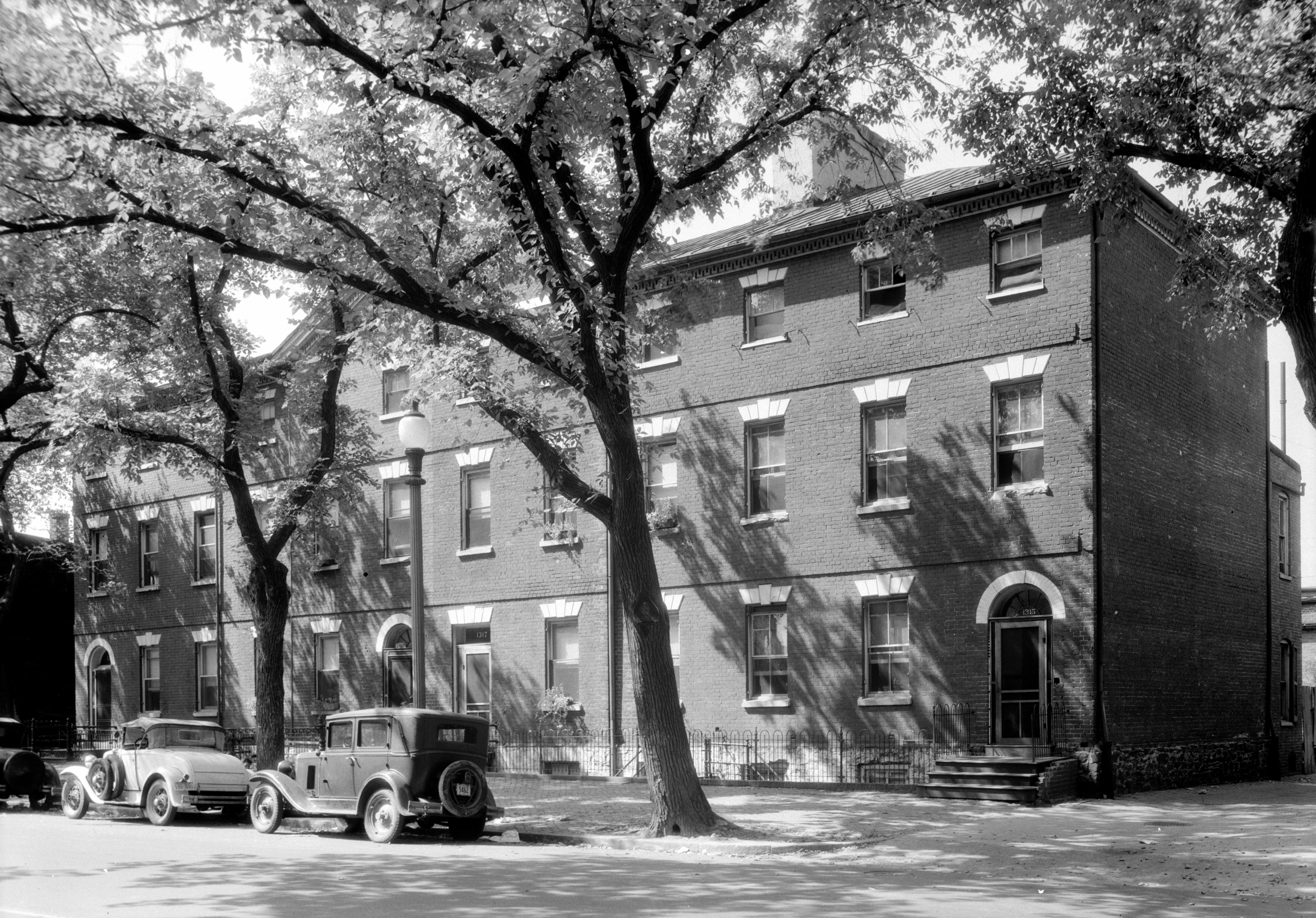
Wheat Row in 1936

The four row houses of Wheat Row were designed in the Late Georgian architectural style. Architectural historian Daniel Reiff has argued that the design is based on that of Hollis Hall, a dormitory at Harvard University constructed from 1762 to 1763. Reiff has noted that Wheat Row is a prime example of the vernacular domestic architecture constructed in the District of Columbia during the city's first three decades.

Each of the four row houses that make up Wheat Row has a foundation made of stone, and a basement with stone walls. The exterior walls are all brick in a Flemish bond pattern. The north wall is different in that it is laid in an English bond pattern. It is believed that this is the only example of English bond brickwork in a building constructed in the city's first decades. The building containing the four row houses is 102.5 feet (31.2 m) long and 34 feet (10 m) wide. The longer facades each have 12 bays, with each house having three bays. The middle two houses are slightly narrower than the end houses. The entrance is found on the long east facade. The four middle bays on this facade project slightly. The south facade originally had three bays, while the north facade had none. Today, Harbour Square townhouses abut both the north and south facades, and prevent any openings in either wall. Belt courses consisting of four headers separate the first and second and the second and third floors on the east, west, and south facades. The belt course on the south facade is no longer visible due to the adjoining 1964 townhouse.

The window sills and decorative window lintels in the facades are both of stone, with the lintel having bevels etched into them to mimic voussoirs and keystones. A trench, surrounded by a black wrought iron fence and not visible from the street, permits light to enter the basement windows. The basement window sills are wood and the lintels brick. The first and second story windows are 9/9, (Note: This means that the upper window consists of nine small, equally sized, rectangular panes. The bottom window is identical to the top window.) while the smaller third story windows are 6/3. (Note: This means that the upper window consists of six small, equally sized, rectangular panes. The bottom window has just three panes.) The basement windows are all 6/6.

Wheat Row is topped by a low hip roof, sheathed in copper. Double chimneys rise where the row houses meet. A triangular pediment rises above the projecting central section of the structure, pierced by an oval window. (This window's stone facing is not historic, and was created in 1964.) A bas-relief fretwork wooden cornice runs most of the way around the building, except where a stone band separates the pediment from the third floor.

Originally, the wood trim and stone band of Wheat Row were all white, which contrasted with the red brick of the building. During the 1962–1963 construction of Harbour Square, they were painted light grey to match the trim of the rest of the development.

Four doorways in the east facade provide access to the row houses. Two occupy the corner bays, while two occupy the center-most bays. Each door has a semi-circular fanlight and a brick arch over the door. At some point before the 1962–1963 construction of Harbour Square, the brick arch over the door to 1317 4th Street was replaced with a brick jack arch. This jack arch was removed and the facade restored to its uniform appearance. Modern lighting fixtures illuminate each door.

The interior plan of each of Wheat Row's townhouses is Federal in style. There are two rooms on each floor, and side halls with stairways. The internal space does not reflect the symmetrical facade. The interior walls of Wheat Row, which are wood frame, have been modified many times over the years to accommodate modern appliances and conveniences (such as bathrooms).

== Bibliography ==
- Abbot, William Wright; Chase, Philander D.; Hoth, David R.; Patrick, Christian Sternberg; Twohig, Dorothy, eds. (2009). The Papers of George Washington, Presidential Series: 1 January-30 April 1794. Charlottesville, Va.: University Press of Virginia. ISBN 9780813928463.
- Arnebeck, Bob (Spring–Summer 1991). "Tracking the Speculators: Greenleaf and Nicholson in the Federal City". Washington History: 112–125.
- Banks, James G.; Banks, Peter S. (2004). The Unintended Consequences: Family and Community, the Victims of Isolated Poverty. Lanham, Md.: University Press of America. ISBN 9780761828563.
- Benedetto, Robert; Donovan, Jane; Du Vall, Kathleen (2003). Historical Dictionary of Washington, D.C.. Lanham, Md.: Scarecrow Press. ISBN 0810840944.
- Clark, Allen C. (1902). "James Greenleaf". Records of the Columbia Historical Society: 212–237. JSTOR 40066803.
- Clark, Allen (1901). Greenleaf and Law in the Federal City. Washington, D.C.: Press of W.F. Roberts.
- Evelyn, Douglas E.; Dickson, Paul; Ackerman, S.J. (2008). On This Spot: Pinpointing the Past in Washington, D.C. Sterling, Va.: Capital Books. ISBN 9781933102702.
- Gutheim, Frederick A.; Lee, Antoinette Josephine (2006). Worthy of the Nation: Washington, D.C., From L'Enfant to the National Capital Planning Commission. Baltimore, Md.: Johns Hopkins University Press. ISBN 9780801883286.
- Hayward, Mary Ellen; Belfoure, Charles (2001). The Baltimore Rowhouse. New York: Princeton Architectural Press. ISBN 1568981775.
- Kendall, Joshua C. (2010). The Forgotten Founding Father: Noah Webster's Obsession and the Creation of an American Culture. New York: G.P. Putnam's Sons. ISBN 9780399156991.
- Khademi, Mona (2013). "Laura Dreyfus-Barney and 'Abdu'l-Bahá's Visit to the West". In Mottahedeh, Negar (ed.). 'Abdu'l-Bahá's Journey West: The Evolution of Human Solidarity. New York: Palgrave Macmillan. ISBN 9781137032003.
- Moeller, Gerard Martin; Feldblyum, Boris (2012). AIA Guide to the Architecture of Washington, D.C. Baltimore, Md.: Johns Hopkins University Press. ISBN 9781421402703.
- National Capital Planning Commission (April 16, 1973). "Wheat Row". National Register of Historic Places Inventory - Nomination Form. Form 10-300 (Rev. 6-72) (PDF) (Report). National Park Service, U.S. Department of the Interior.
- Pinheiro, John C. (2008). "George Washington's Leadership Style and Conflict at the Federal City". In Watson, Robert W. (ed.). White House Studies Compendium. Vol. 5. New York: Nova Science Publishers. ISBN 9781600215339.
- Prentiss, William C. (2013). One Man In His Time: A Memoir. Bloomington, Ind.: AuthorHouse. ISBN 9781491824634.
- Reiff, Daniel D. (1971). Washington Architecture, 1791-1861: Problems in Development. Washington, D.C.: U.S. Government Printing Office.
- Royster, Charles (2000). The Fabulous History of the Dismal Swamp Company: A Story of George Washington's Times. New York: Alfred A. Knopf. ISBN 0679433457.
- Scott, Pamela; Lee, Antoinette Josephine (1993). Buildings of the District of Columbia. Oxford, UK: Oxford University Press. ISBN 9780195061468.
- Subcommittee on Fiscal and Government Affairs (1978). Amend Redevelopment Act of 1945 and Transfer U.S. Real Property to RLA: Hearings and Markups Before the Subcommittee on Fiscal and Government Affairs and the Committee on the District of Columbia. U.S. House of Representatives. 95th Cong., 2d sess. Washington, D.C.: U.S. Government Printing Office.
- Wennersten, John R. (2014). The Historic Waterfront of Washington, D.C. Charleston, S.C.: The History Press. ISBN 9781626193987.
- Williams, Paul Kelsey (2005). Southwest Washington, D.C. Charleston, S.C.: Arcadia. ISBN 0738542199.
