= Duncanson-Cranch House =

Historic house in Washington, D.C., United States

- U.S. National Register of Historic Places
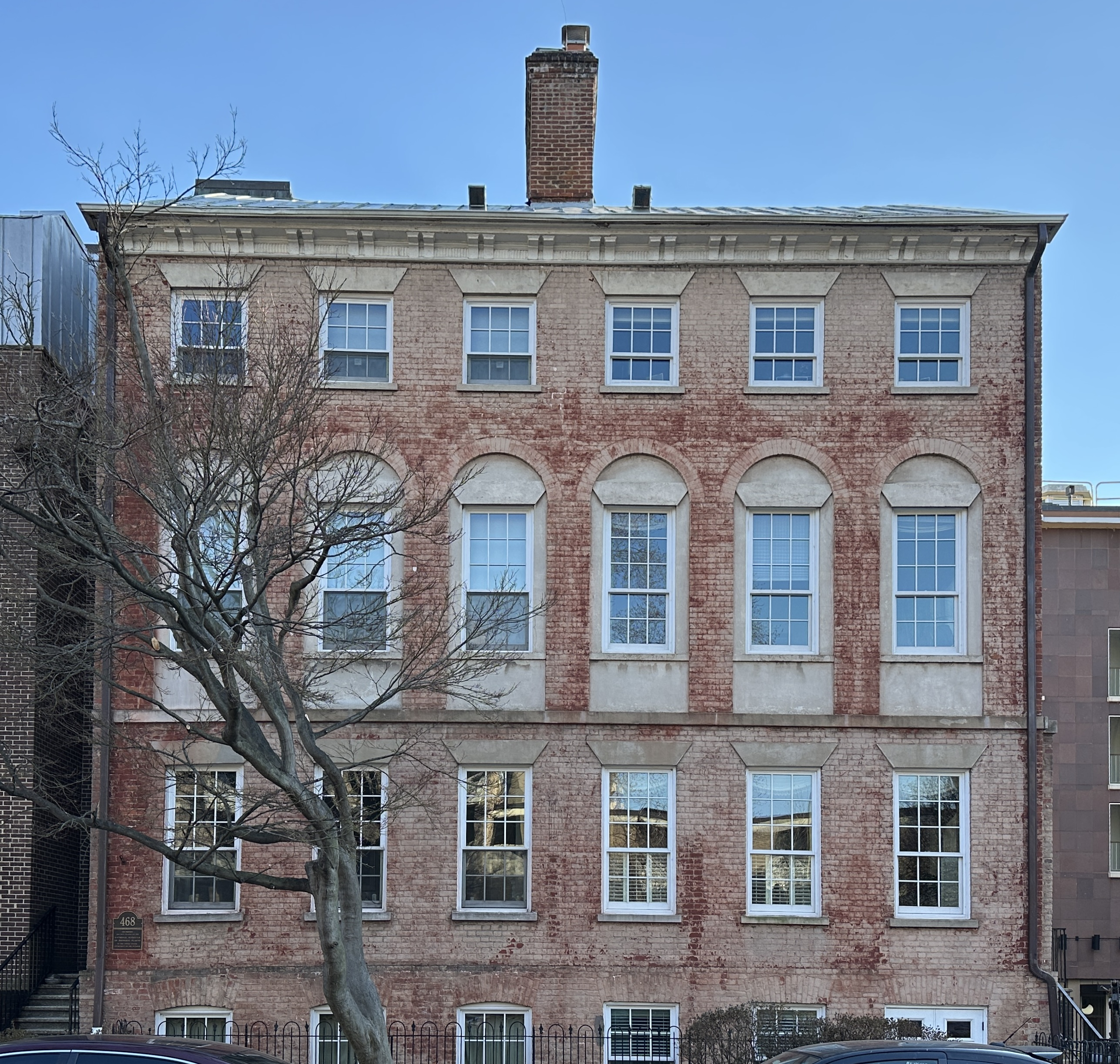
- Duncanson-Cranch House in 2026

- Location within Central Washington, D.C. Location within the District of Columbia Location within the United States
- Location: 468-470 N Street, SW; Washington, D.C.
- Coordinates: 38°52′29″N 77°1′6″W
- Built: c. 1794; 232 years ago
- Architect: Francis Allen
- Architectural style: Federal
- NRHP reference No.: 73002081
- Added to NRHP: July 26, 1973

The Duncanson-Cranch House is an historic house located in the Southwest Waterfront neighborhood of Washington, D.C. at 468-470 N Street SW.

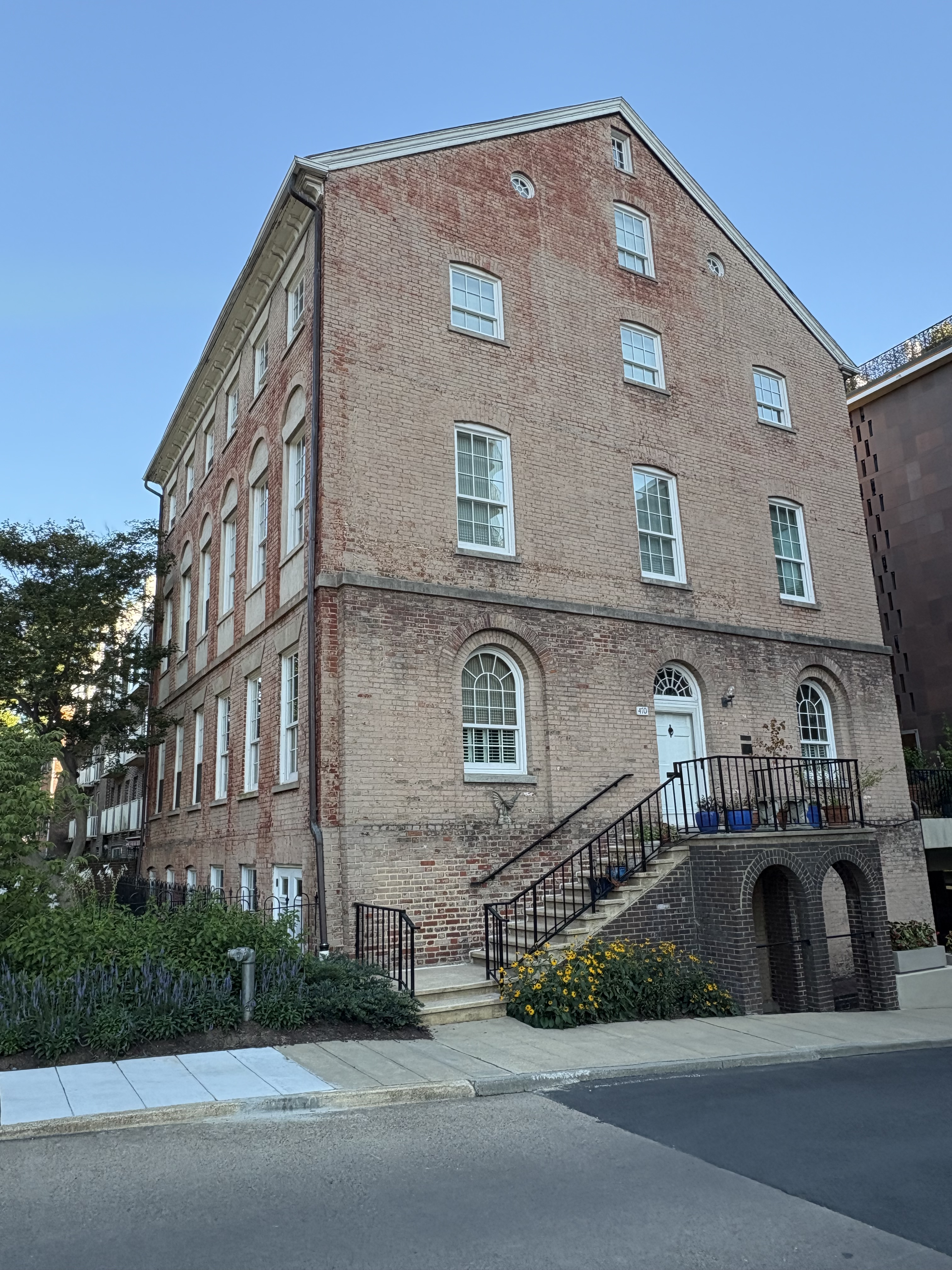
The Duncanson-Cranch House in August 2025

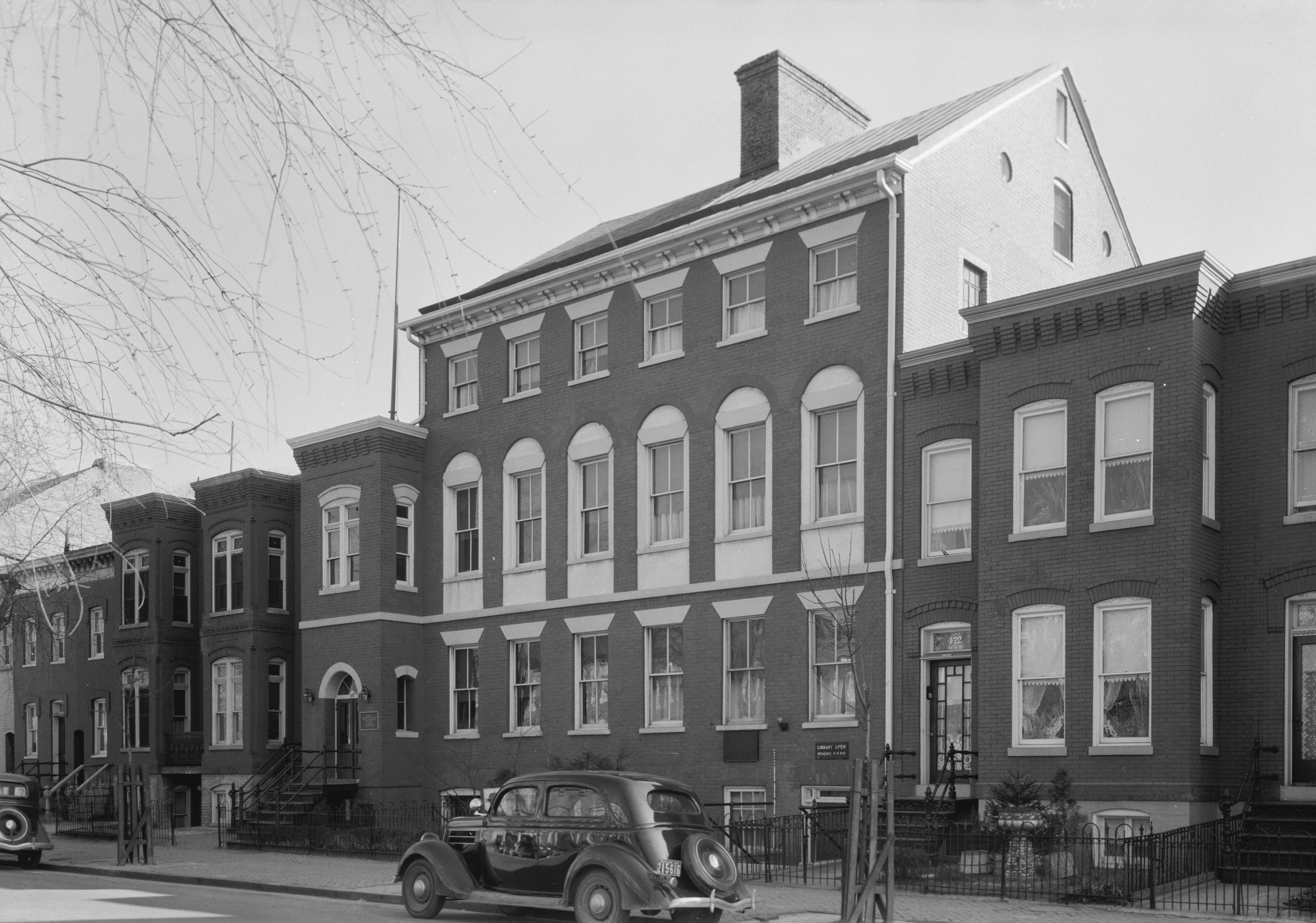
Duncanson-Cranch House in 1933

== History ==
The residence is attributed to William Lovering and was completed around 1794. During the early 20th century, it served as the Barney Neighborhood House, a home for poor women that worked to improve cultural awareness among the working class. John Neligh, the director of industrial crafts at Barney Neighborhood House, also owned 1315 4th Street SW (part of Wheat Row). It was listed on the District of Columbia Inventory of Historic Sites in 1964 and it was listed on the National Register of Historic Places in 1973. It is now part of the Harbour Square cooperative.
