= Lewis-Syford House =

- U.S. National Register of Historic Places
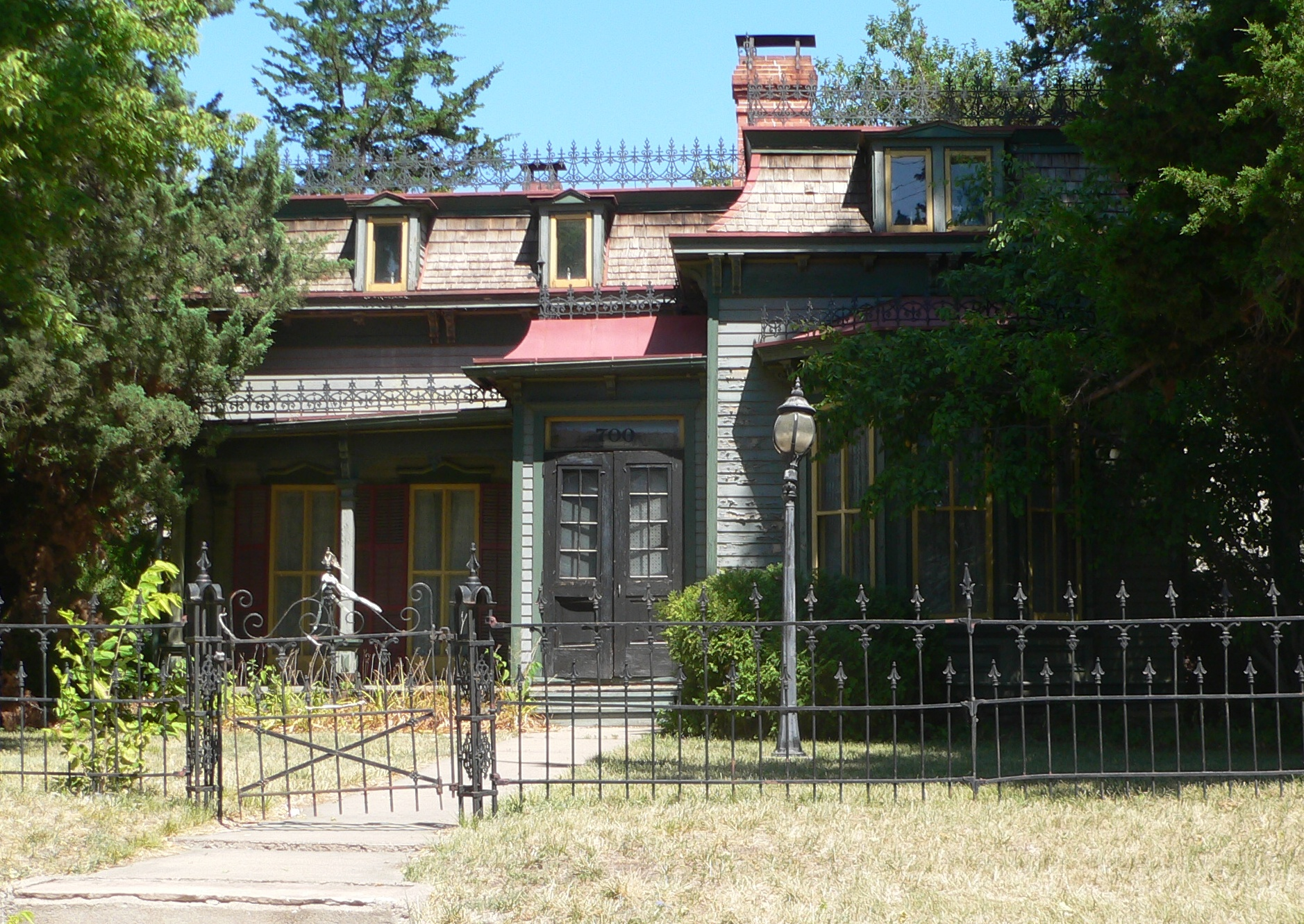

- Location within Nebraska Location within the United States
- Location: 700 North 16th Street; Lincoln, Nebraska
- Coordinates: 40°49′09″N 96°41′52″W
- Area: 9.9 acres (4.0 ha)
- Built: c. 1878
- Architectural style: Second Empire
- NRHP reference No.: 71000486
- Added to NRHP: February 18, 1971

The Lewis-Syford House is a historic building on the campus of the University of Nebraska–Lincoln in Lincoln, Nebraska. It was built in or around 1878 and was added to the National Register of Historic Places in 1971.

== History ==
The Lewis-Syford House was built in the late 1870s (most likely finishing construction in 1878) for Reverend Elisha M. Lewis, a Presbyterian missionary who had been a chaplain in the Union army during the American Civil War. The house was built outside the City of Lincoln's original plat and is one of few remaining examples of Second Empire architecture in Nebraska, featuring cast-iron cresting and a prominent Mansard roof. Lewis died in 1898 and the house was purchased by railroad engineer and cattle breeder DeWitt Syford in 1904. Syford's daughter Constance bequeathed the property to the Nebraska State Historical Society in 1965.

The house and land became part of the University of Nebraska, surrounded by fraternities and sororities along 16th Street. Following a restoration throughout the 1970s, the Lewis-Syford House was used for a variety of university functions, including student counseling, and was purchased by National Geographic photographer Joel Sartore. Sartore renovated the structure, which had fallen into disrepair, for his children to occupy during their time in school, and now rents to students.

The Lewis-Syford House is the oldest and only privately owned building on the University of Nebraska–Lincoln's campus and has been minimally altered since its construction. It was added to the National Register of Historic Places on February 18, 1971.
