= John C. and Augusta (Covell) Lewis House =

- U.S. National Register of Historic Places
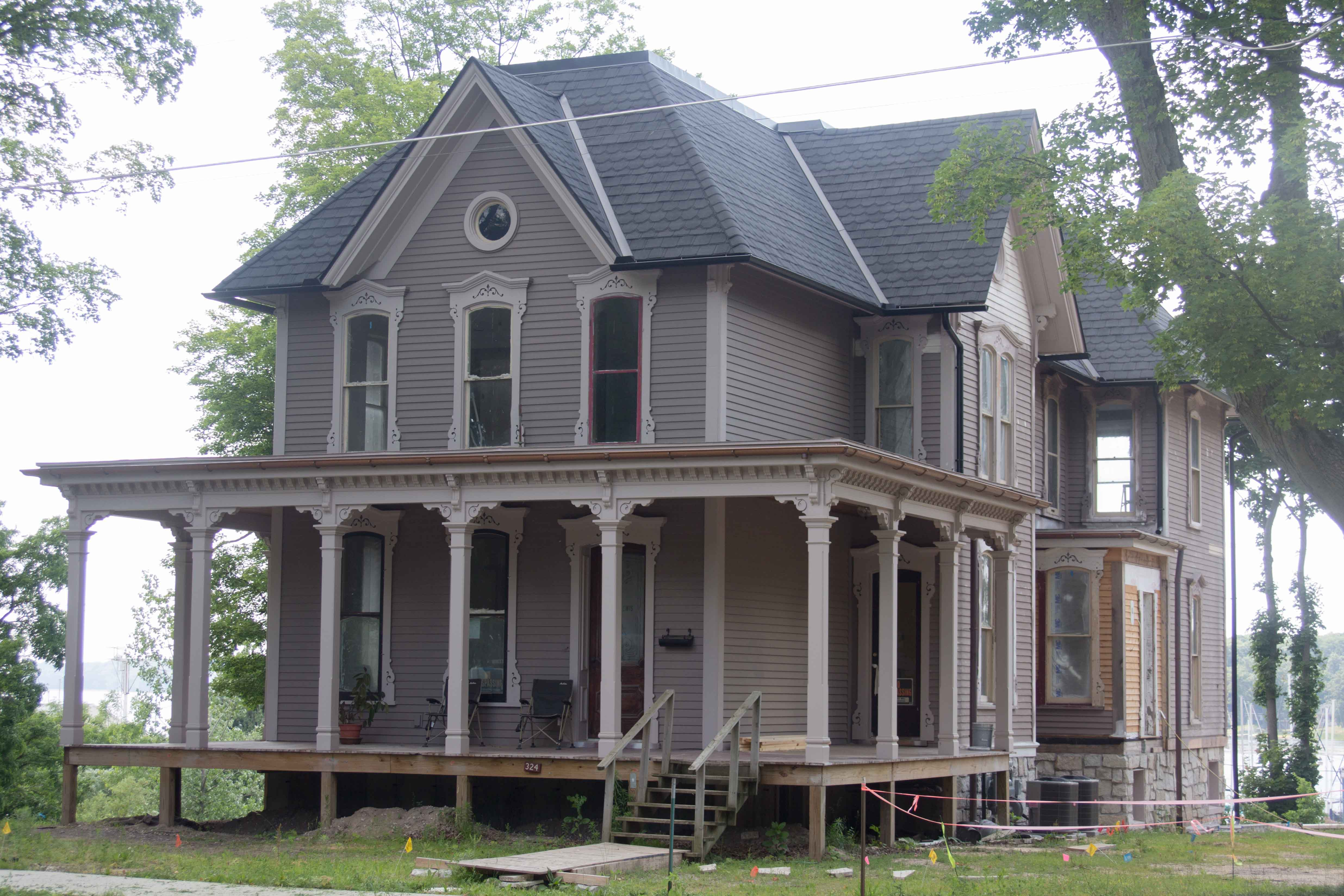

- Location within Michigan Location within the United States
- Interactive map
- Location: 324 S. Mears Ave., Whitehall, Michigan
- Coordinates: 43°24′25″N 86°20′52″W
- Area: less than one acre
- Built: 1878
- Built by: L.L. Marble
- Architectural style: Late Victorian
- NRHP reference No.: 10001027
- Added to NRHP: December 13, 2010

The John C. and Augusta (Covell) Lewis House is a private house located at 324 S. Mears Avenue in Whitehall, Michigan. It was listed on the National Register of Historic Places in 2010. It now houses the Lewis House Bed and Breakfast.

== History ==
John C. Lewis was born in Canada in 1837, and moved to the United States in 1855. He finally settled in Whitehall in 1861, working as a day laborer. There he met his wife Augusta Covell, the two were married in 1864. Lewis soon purchased a sawmill, sold it, purchased another, and began investing in timberlands. The couple moved briefly to Waukesha, Wisconsin, then moved back to Whitehall in 1878, when they built this house.

The Lewises hired local builder L.L Marble to construct the house; work began in April 1878 and was completed by November. John Lewis lived in the house until his death in 1894. After this, ownership of the house was passed to his wife Augusta, who lived there until her own death in 1928. The Lewises' youngest daughter Florence inherited the house, and she lived there until the early 1940s. In 1944, Florence cold the house to local farmers William and Rose Hildebrandt, who converted the house from a single-family home into a nine-bedroom boarding house the called the Lakeview Rooms.

In 1960, a water heater explosion killed the Hildebrandts and damaged the house; their son Carl took over the property and continued to operate the Lakeview Rooms for fifteen more years. In 1976, it was sold to the Blue Lake Fine Arts Camp, who used it as a community school for the arts, then as lodging for out-of-town actors, and then housing for camp faculty. In 2009, Greg and Debra Hillebrand purchased the house. They restored the house, and in 2015 opened it as the Lewis House Bed & Breakfast became a reality in 2015.

== Description ==
The Lewis House is a narrow and deep two-story Late Victorian structure with a roof that includes both gabled and hip-roof areas. The main front section contains three prominent front and side-facing gables. A rounded-corner front entry porch with fluted Tuscan columns is covered by a flat roof. The house is clad with clapboard, and the eaves are supported by brackets at the corners and project widely. The windows are tall and narrow, and have segmental-arch heads and trim with pediment caps and incised detail.
