= Lewis House (Fargo, North Dakota) =

Historic house in North Dakota, United States

- U.S. National Register of Historic Places
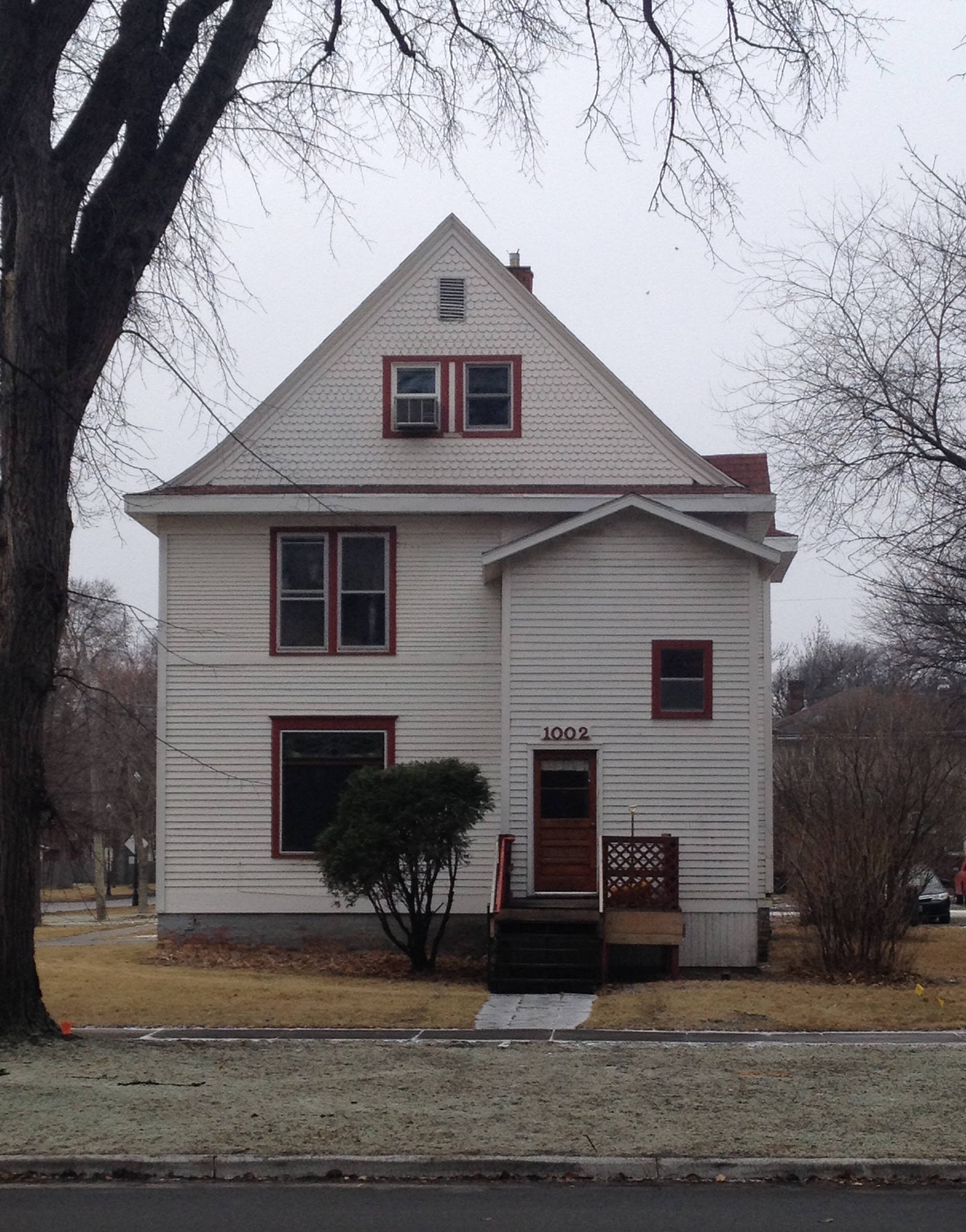
- The Lewis House in 2014

- Location within North Dakota Location within the United States
- Location: 1002 Third Avenue, South, Fargo, North Dakota
- Coordinates: 46°52′17″N 96°47′46″W
- Built: 1899
- Architect: Amer, John
- Architectural style: Classical Revival
- NRHP reference No.: 79003726
- Added to NRHP: October 18, 1979

The Lewis House, built in 1899, is a historic Classical Revival house located at 1002 Third Avenue, South in Fargo, North Dakota. It was listed on the National Register of Historic Places on October 18, 1979. At the time, it was the Minn-Kota Red Cross Chapter Office, which has since moved to 2602 12th Street, North in Fargo.
