= Evan Lewis House =

Historic house in Pennsylvania, United States

- U.S. National Register of Historic Places
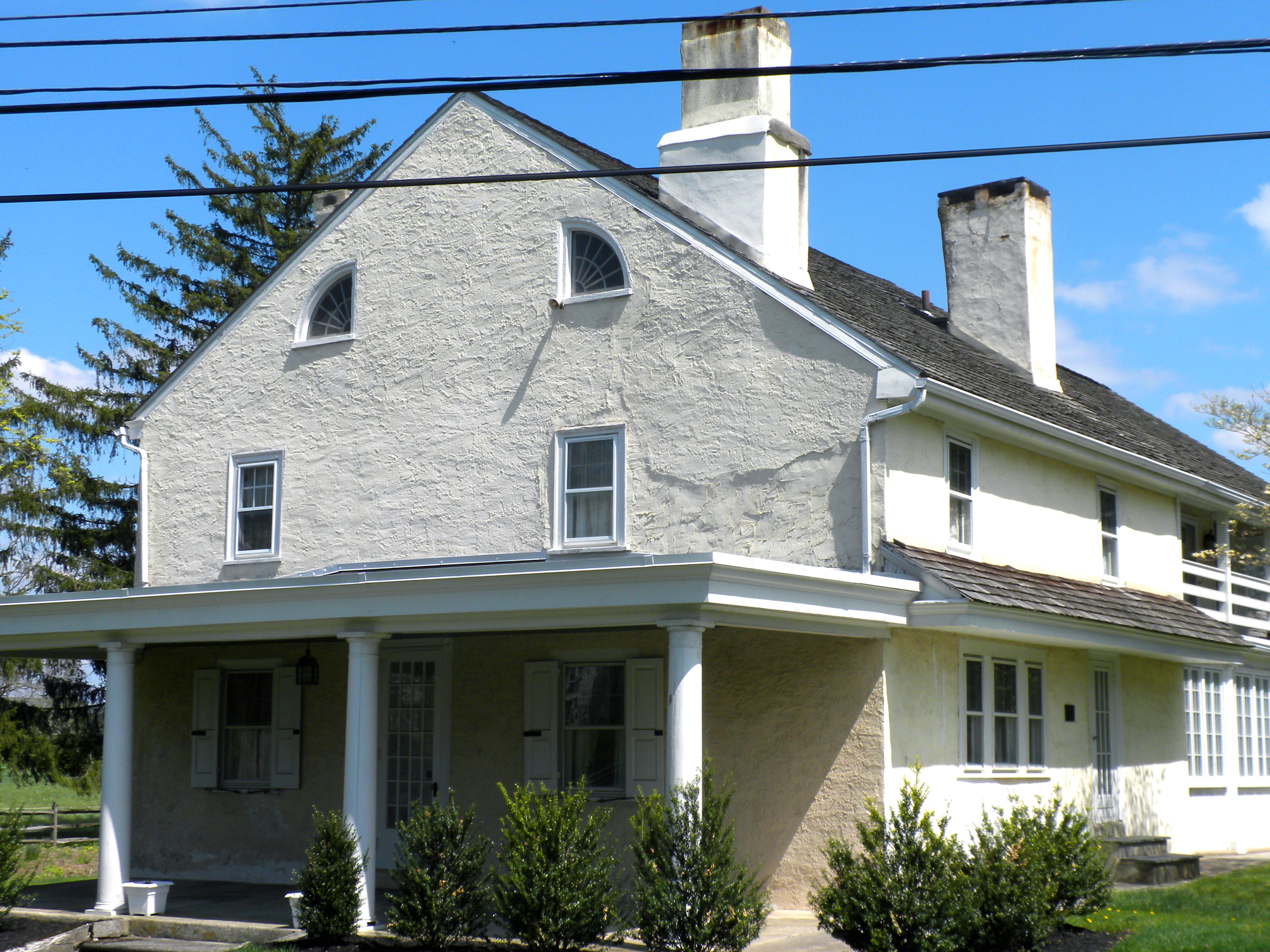
- Evan Lewis House, April 2010

- Location within Pennsylvania Location within the United States
- Location: 117 N. Ship Rd., West Whiteland Township, Pennsylvania
- Coordinates: 40°1′57″N 75°36′42″W
- Area: 5.1 acres (2.1 ha)
- Built: c. 1717, 1821
- Built by: Evan, Lewis
- MPS: West Whiteland Township MRA
- NRHP reference No.: 84003286
- Added to NRHP: August 2, 1984

Evan Lewis House is a historic home located in West Whiteland Township, Chester County, Pennsylvania. It was built about 1717, and was originally a single-pile, hall-and-parlor dwelling. It has been expanded and modified over the years, including absorption of former outbuildings into the structure of the house. It is a 2 1/2-story, stuccoed stone structure. Also on the property is a contributing stone bank barn (1821), built on the foundations of an earlier barn.

It was listed on the National Register of Historic Places in 1984.
