= List of State Register of Heritage Places in the Town of Cottesloe =

The State Register of Heritage Places is maintained by the Heritage Council of Western Australia. As of 2026, 430 places are heritage-listed in the Town of Cottesloe, of which 27 are on the State Register of Heritage Places.

== List ==
The Western Australian State Register of Heritage Places, as of 2026, lists the following 27 state registered places within the Town of Cottesloe:

Place name	Place #	Street number	Street name	Suburb or town	Co-ordinates	Notes & former names	Photo
Cottesloe Civic Centre	593	109	Broome Street	Cottesloe	31.993567°S 115.755695°E	Town Hall & Civic Centre, Overton Lodge, Cottesloe War Memorial	
WA School for Deaf Children	594	53	Curtin Avenue	Cottesloe	32.009167°S 115.755066°E	WA Deaf and Dumb Institution, WA Institute for Deaf Education	
Lady Lawley Cottage	596	8	Gibney Street	Cottesloe	32.008214°S 115.753649°E	Lady Lawley Cottage by the Sea, John, Nicholson Convalescent Home for Service Women	
Cottesloe Beach Hotel	597	104	Marine Parade	Cottesloe	31.994692°S 115.752171°E	Hotel Cottesloe	
Wanslea	598	78 & 80	Railway Street	Cottesloe	31.988217°S 115.765661°E	International Order of Oddfellows Orphanage	
Cottesloe Post Office & Telephone Exchange (former)	599	81-83	Forrest Street	Cottesloe	31.996464°S 115.761549°E	Cottesloe Post Office, Telecom Depot	
Wearne Hostel	603	1	Gibney Street	Cottesloe	32.009365°S 115.753038°E	Ministering Children's League Convalescent Home, Fremantle Hospital Mosman Park Annex	
Claremont Police Station, Lock-up & Stables	2044	137-139	Grant Street	Claremont	31.986723°S 115.771241°E	Claremont Police Station and Lock-up	
Claremont Fire Station	2664	441	Stirling Highway	Claremont	31.987491°S 115.769804°E		
Cottesloe Flour Mill (former)	3234	14	Athelstan Road	Cottesloe	31.991172°S 115.761989°E		
Le Fanu	3306	2	Salvado Street	Cottesloe	32.0050°S 115.7524°E	Banksia	
Belvedere	3452	12	Rosendo Street	Cottesloe	32.003959°S 115.753310°E	Belevedere, Belvediere	
Tukurua, Cottesloe	3453	5 & 7	Rosendo Street	Cottesloe	32.004423°S 115.752899°E	The Beach House, Burt's Summer Residence Built for Septimus Burt in 1896	
Kulahea	3677	4	Forrest Street	Cottesloe	31.995686°S 115.752737°E	Kalahea Thought to be the only private dwelling designed by George Temple-Poole	
Macaulay House, Cottesloe	3680	62 & 62A	Forrest Street	Cottesloe	31.995751°S 115.757828°E	McCaulay House, Donard Lodge	
Pine Lodge	3682	42	John Street	Cottesloe	31.994721°S 115.757109°E		
Old Cable Station	4586	1 & 2	Curtin Avenue	Cottesloe	32.015720°S 115.752619°E	McCall Community Support Centre	
Lewis House	7467	8	Barsden Street	Cottesloe	31.997676°S 115.758609°E		
Trafalgar House	7468	15	Barsden Street	Cottesloe	31.997102°S 115.757890°E		
Pine Court	7495	96-98	Broome Street	Cottesloe	31.995334°S 115.756596°E		
John Curtin's House	7935	24	Jarrad Street	Cottesloe	31.9987°S 115.759°E		
Cottesloe Beach Pylon	7984	offshore at	Cottesloe Beach in line with John Street	Cottesloe	31.995382°S 115.750100°E	Cottesloe Beach Shark Proof Pool, Foreman's Folly	
St Philip's Anglican Church	8110	63	Napier Street	Cottesloe	31.993253°S 115.760216°E		
Sea View Golf Course Club	15822		Jarrad Street	Cottesloe	31.997493°S 115.753989°E	Cottesloe Golf Club	
Cottesloe Beach Precinct	16637		Marine Parade	Cottesloe	31.994155°S 115.751126°E		
Overton Lodge	18556	22	Warnham Road	Cottesloe	31.994291°S 115.754595°E	Caretaker's Cottage	
Claremont Police Station	18613	139	Grant Street	Claremont	31.986728°S 115.771233°E		
