= Lewis-Williams House =

Historic house in Wisconsin, United States

- U.S. National Register of Historic Places
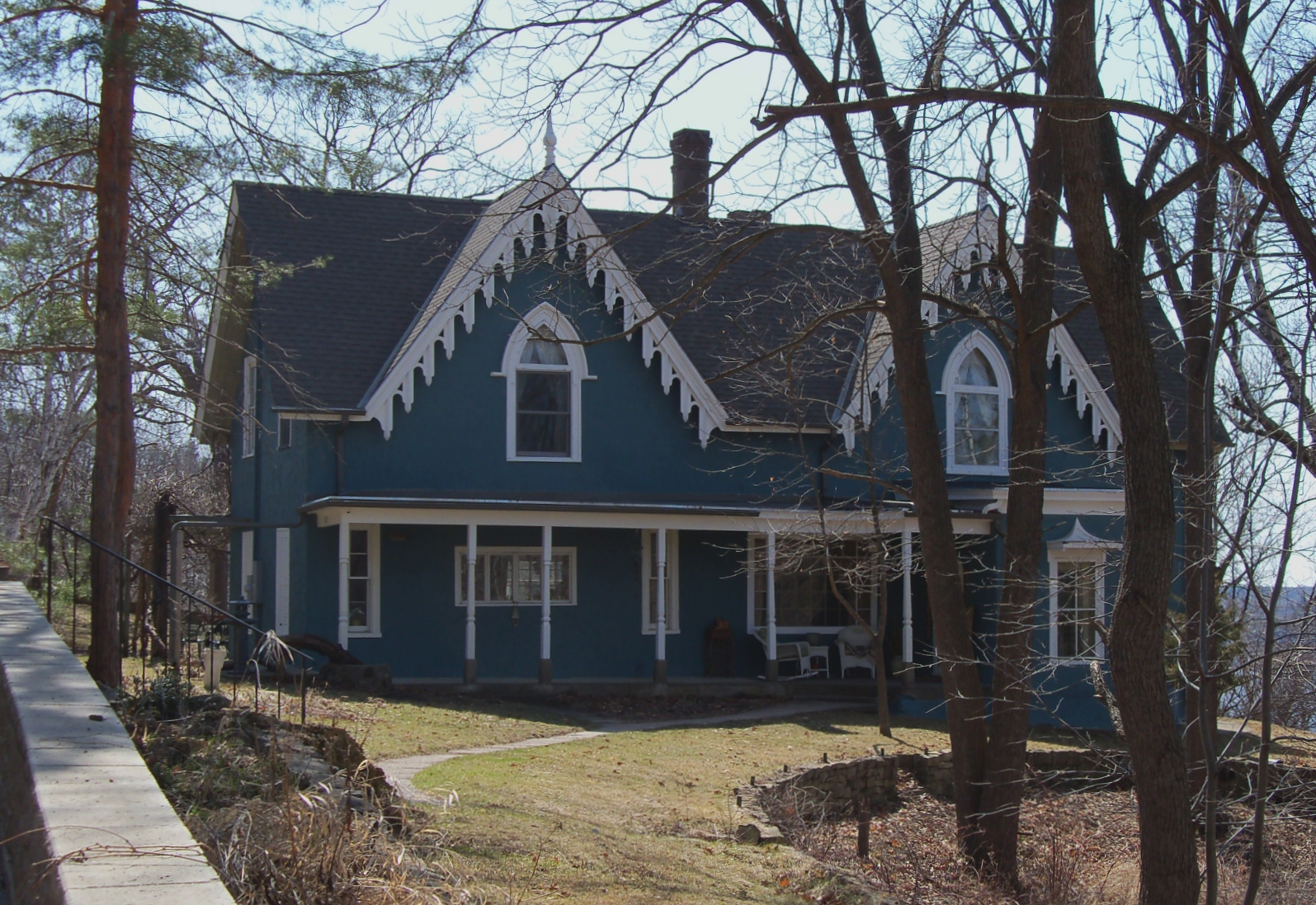

- Location within Wisconsin Location within the United States
- Location: 101 3rd Street, Hudson, Wisconsin
- Coordinates: 44°58′18″N 92°45′19″W
- Area: less than one acre
- Built: c. 1860
- Architectural style: Gothic Revival
- MPS: Hudson and North Hudson MRA
- NRHP reference No.: 85000050
- Added to NRHP: January 2, 1985

The Lewis-Williams House is a historic house located in Hudson, Wisconsin. It was added to the National Register of Historic Places in 1985.

It is a one-and-a-half-story "romantic" Gothic Revival cottage overlooking the St. Croix River. It has multiple steep gables "ornamented with finials and heavy elaborate wooden bargeboard with pendants."

It was bought by Dr. Boyd T. Williams in 1930 and used as a cancer treatment facility. Williams died in 1948; the house remains as a "historic representative of the locality's development of health services and the last surviving symbol of Dr. Boyd T. Williams' medical contributions."
