= John L. Lewis House =

Historic house in Illinois, United States

- U.S. National Register of Historic Places
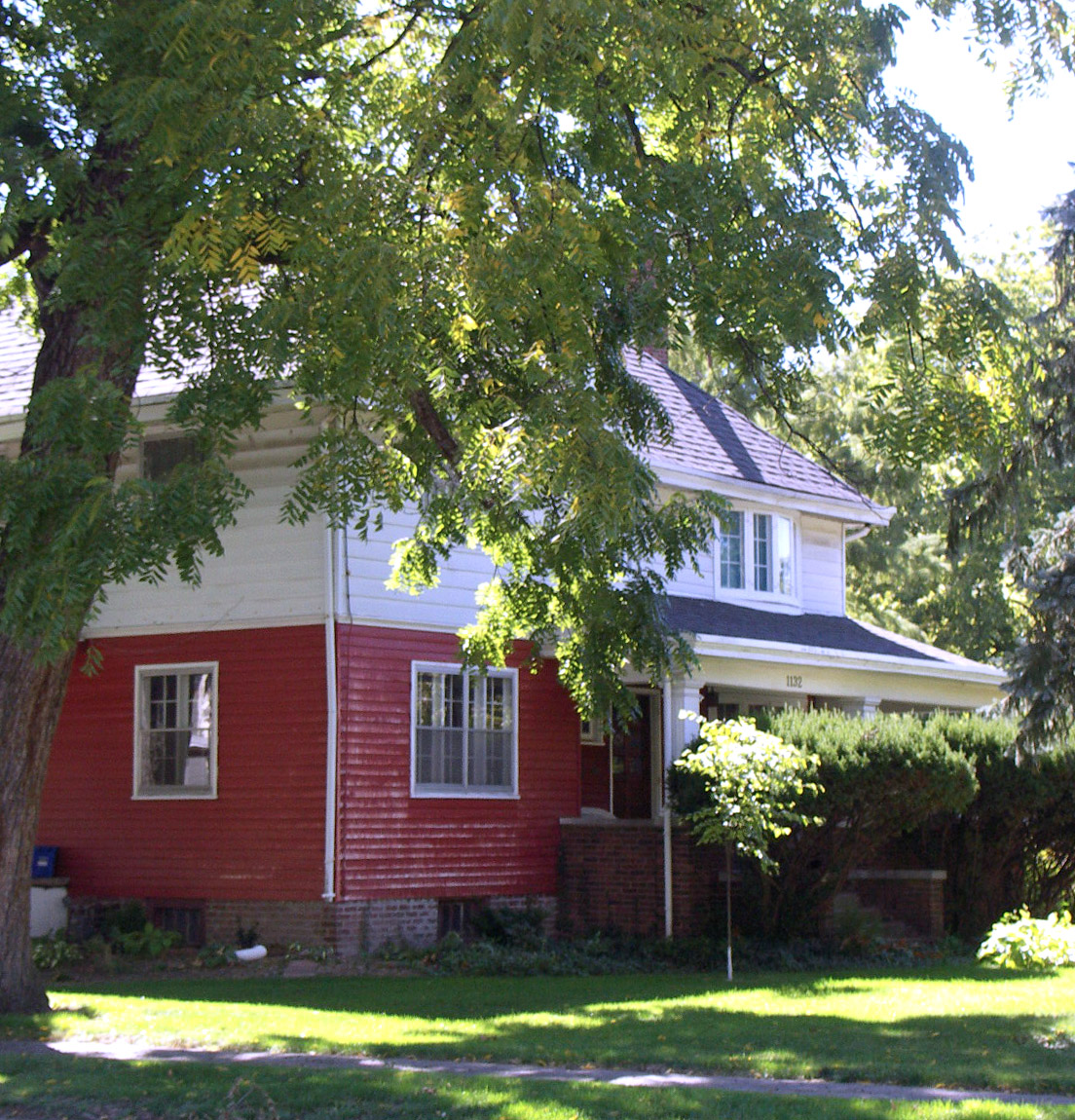

- Location within Illinois Location within the United States
- Location: 1132 W. Lawrence Ave., Springfield, Illinois
- Coordinates: 39°47′38″N 89°40′22″W
- Area: less than one acre
- NRHP reference No.: 79000867
- Added to NRHP: September 10, 1979

The John L. Lewis House is a historic house located at 1132 West Lawrence Avenue in Springfield, Illinois. The house was the home of American labor leader John L. Lewis from 1917 to 1965, encompassing the most productive and influential of his adult life. Born in 1880, Lewis became a coal miner at the age of 15 and quickly became active in union activities. Three years after he moved to his house in Springfield, Lewis became president of the United Mine Workers of America. Lewis became a prominent national labor leader in his new role, and he used his position to support union efforts in other industries as well. He founded the Congress of Industrial Organizations in 1935, becoming its first president, and helped lead strikes in the steel and automotive industries. Lewis retired from his presidency of the United Mine Workers in 1960 and died nine years later.

The house was added to the National Register of Historic Places on September 10, 1979.
