= Edward Simon Lewis House =

Historic house in Washington, D.C., United States

- U.S. National Register of Historic Places
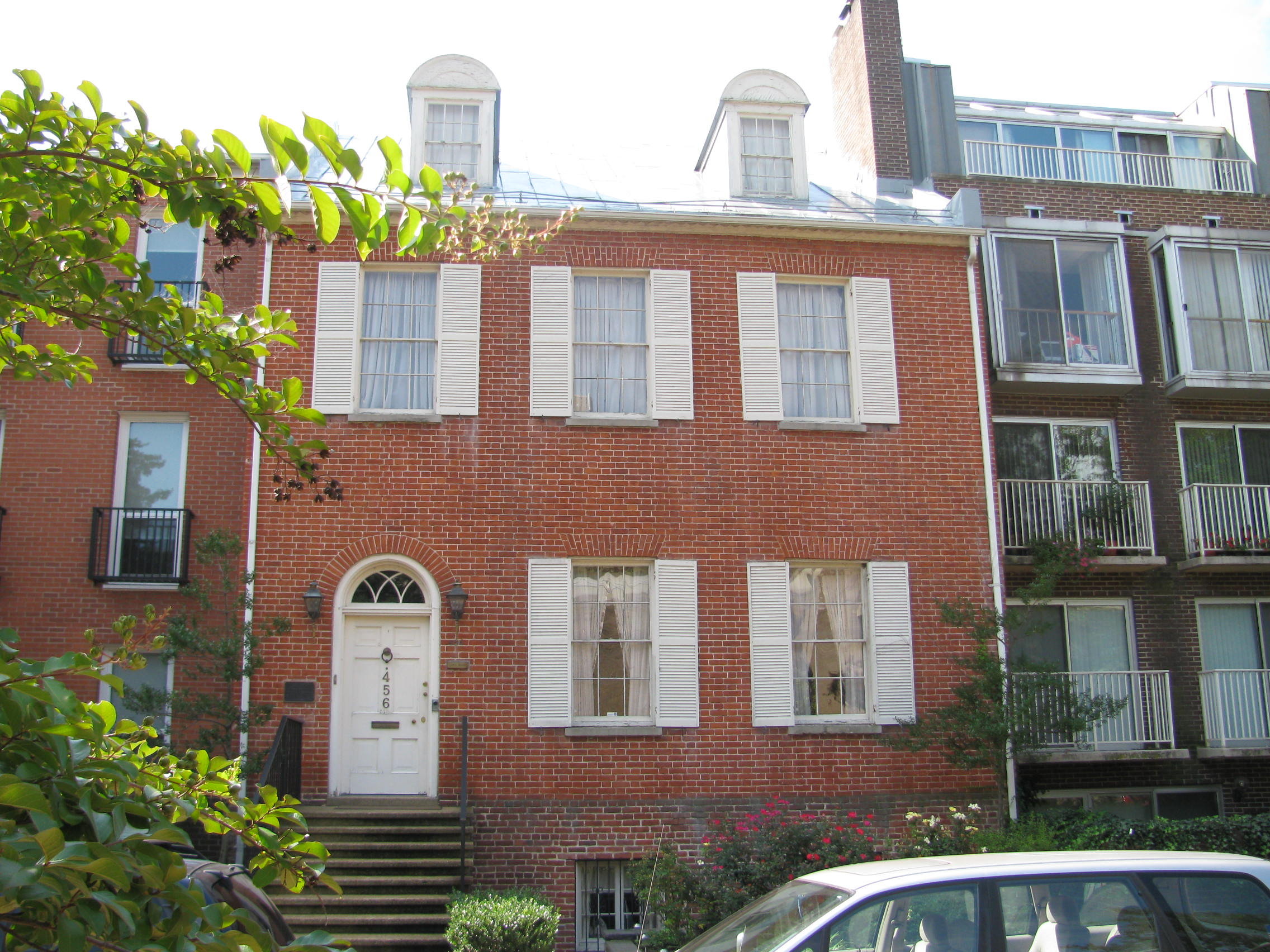

- Location within Washington, D.C.
- Location: 456 N Street, SW; Washington, D.C.
- Coordinates: 38°52′28.02″N 77°1′4.98″W
- Built: c. 1815
- Architectural style: Federal
- NRHP reference No.: 73002094
- Added to NRHP: July 23, 1973

The Edward Simon Lewis House is a historic house, located at 456 N Street SW, Washington, D.C. in the Southwest Waterfront neighborhood.

== History ==
The Federal period house was completed around 1815 and renovated in 1966.

It has been listed on the District of Columbia Inventory of Historic Sites since 1964, and it was listed on the National Register of Historic Places in 1973. It is now a part of the Harbour Square co-op.

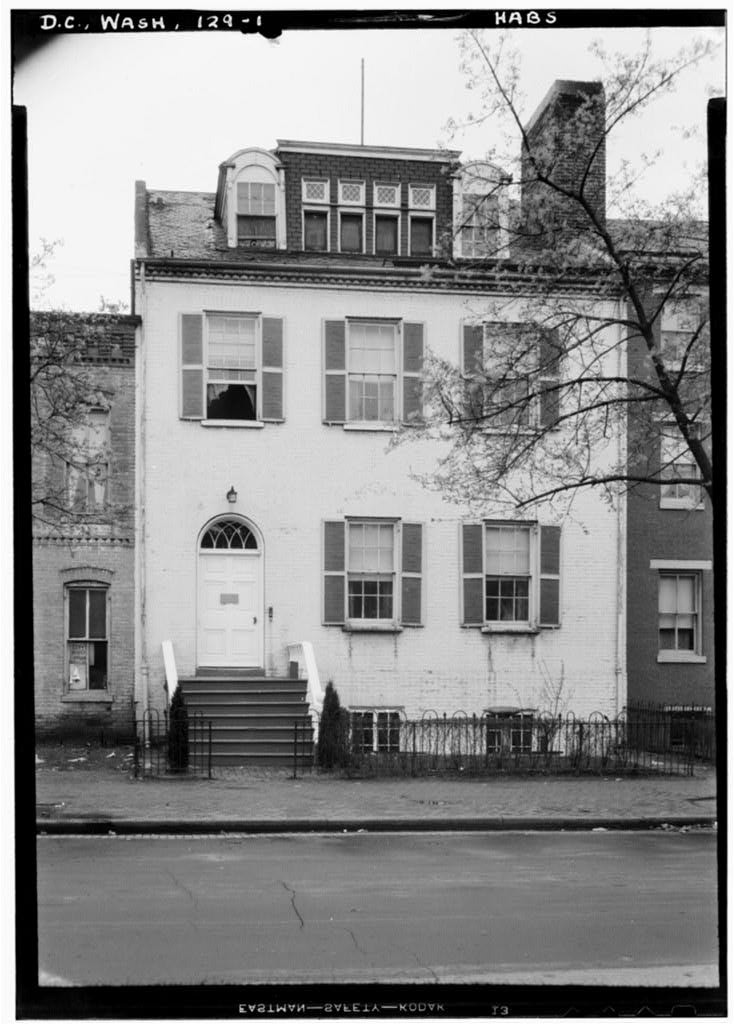
Edward Simon Lewis House in 1936
