= Isaac Lewis House (Stratford, Connecticut) =

Historic house in Connecticut, United States

- U.S. National Register of Historic Places
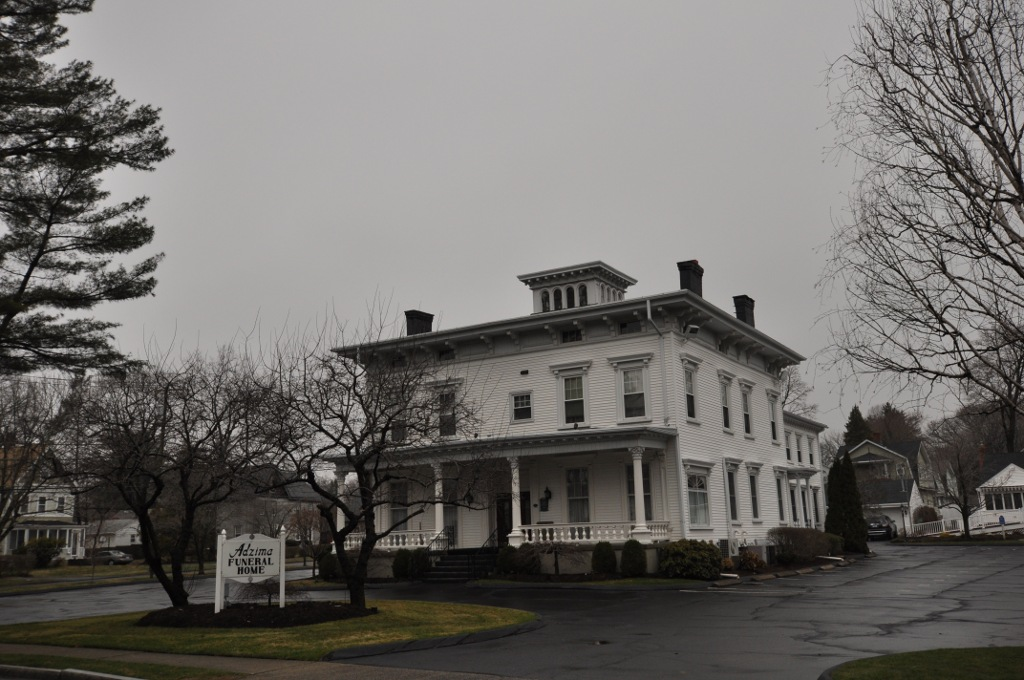

- Location within Connecticut Location within the United States
- Location: 50 Paradise Green Place, Stratford, Connecticut
- Coordinates: 41°12′33.36″N 73°7′53.98″W
- Built: 1858
- Architect: Lewis, Isaac
- Architectural style: Italianate
- NRHP reference No.: 91001739
- Added to NRHP: November 21, 1991

The Isaac Lewis House is a historic house at 50 Paradise Green Places in Stratford, Connecticut. It is a large two story wood-frame structure, five bays wide, with a porch extending across its front and a lantern section raised above its shallow-pitch hip roof. The porch is supported by columns with Corinthian capitals, and has a low balustrade with turned balusters. The eave of the main roof is deep and studded with jigsawn brackets. A 20th century addition extends to the rear. Built c. 1858–59, it is a fine local example of Italianate architecture. It was built by Isaac Lewis, who made his fortune doing construction work for John Jacob Astor III and other wealthy New York City elites.

The house was listed on the National Register of Historic Places in 1991. It is currently used as a funeral home.

== See also ==
- National Register of Historic Places listings in Fairfield County, Connecticut
