= John W. Lewis House =

Historic house in Illinois, United States

- U.S. National Register of Historic Places
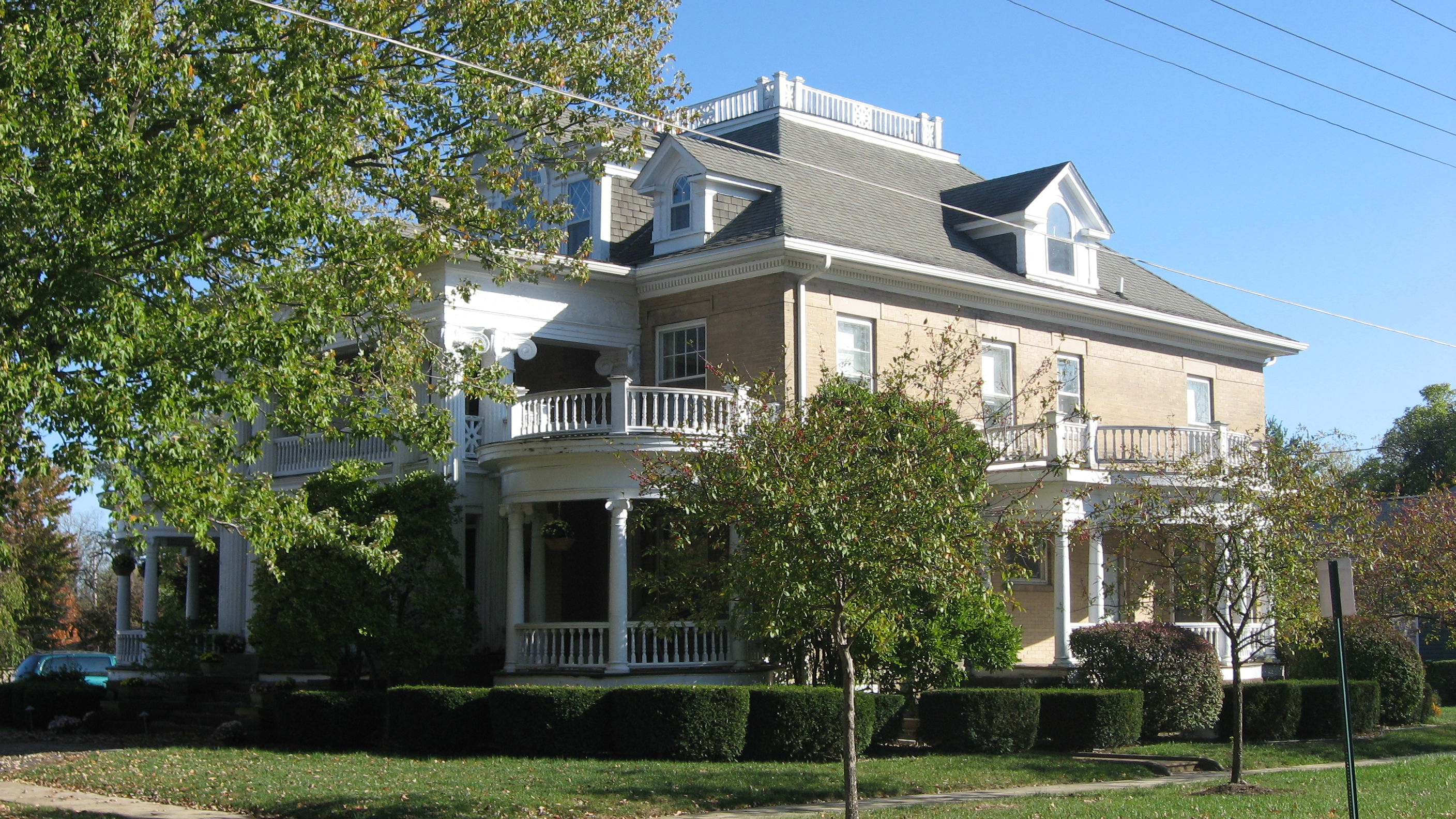

- Location within Illinois Location within the United States
- Location: 503 Chestnut St., Marshall, Illinois
- Coordinates: 39°23′13″N 87°41′42″W
- Area: 0.3 acres (0.12 ha)
- Architectural style: Classical Revival
- NRHP reference No.: 82002519
- Added to NRHP: February 26, 1982

Side view

The John W. Lewis House is a historic house located at 503 Chestnut St. in Marshall, Illinois. The house was built between 1906 and 1908 for John W. Lewis, a politician and early settler of Clark County. Architects Barber & Kluttz designed the 2 1/2-story Classical Revival house. A white two-story verandah marks the front entrance of the house. Two-story Ionic columns support the verandah around the entrance; to either side, the verandah ends at a large circular section supported by one-story columns. A smaller two-story verandah with a similar design surrounds the side entrance. The house's hipped roof features three dormers and cresting along its peak.

The house was added to the National Register of Historic Places on February 26, 1982.
