= John S. and Izola Lewis House =

Historic house in Utah, United States

- U.S. National Register of Historic Places
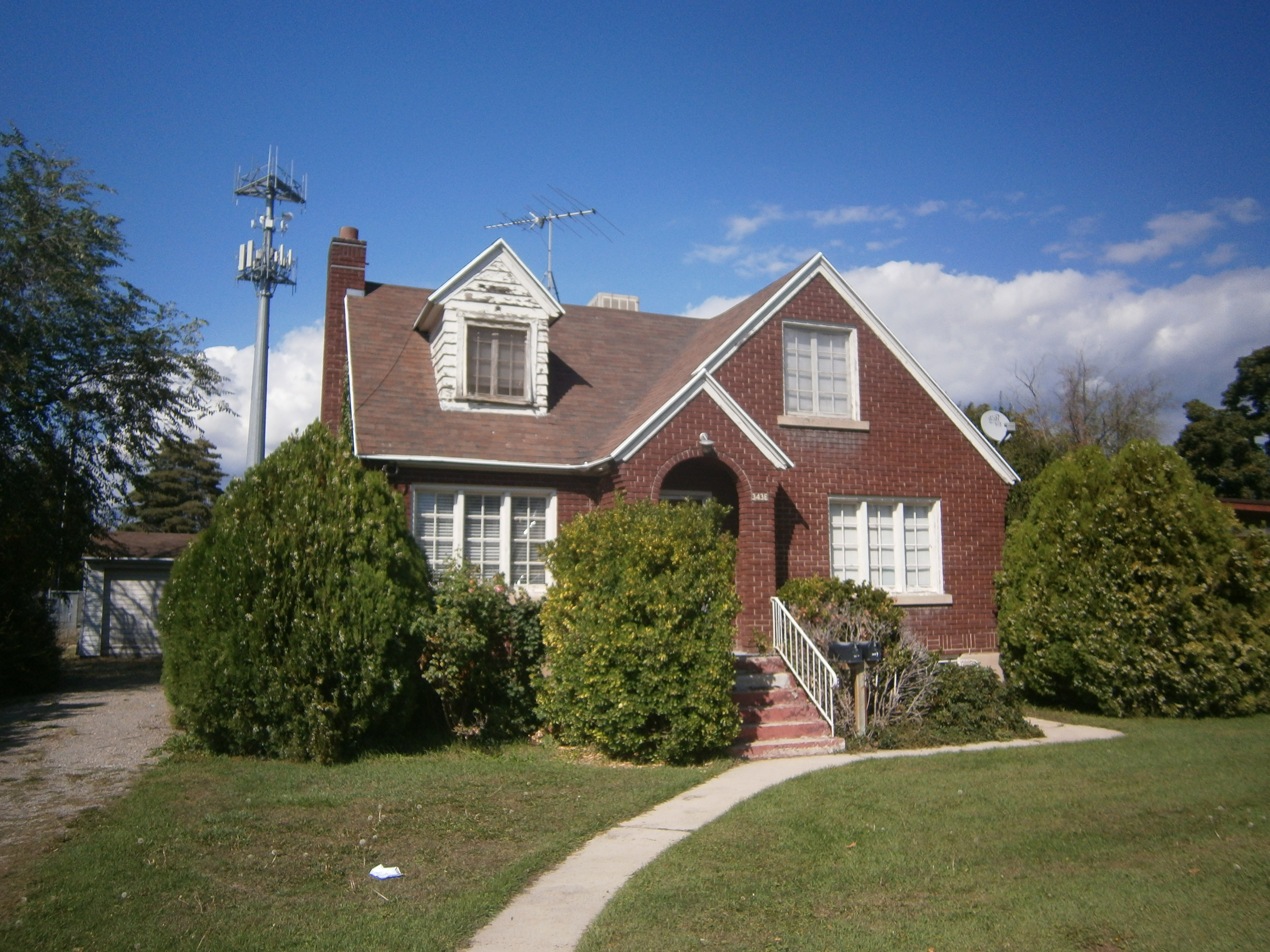

- Location within Utah Location within the United States
- Location: 343 E. 720 S., Orem, Utah
- Coordinates: 40°17′4″N 111°41′12″W
- Area: 0.3 acres (0.12 ha)
- Built: 1938
- Architectural style: Late 19th and 20th Century Revivals
- MPS: Orem, Utah MPS
- NRHP reference No.: 98000671
- Added to NRHP: June 11, 1998

The John S. and Izola Lewis House, at 343 E. 720 S. in Orem, Utah, was built in 1938. It was listed on the National Register of Historic Places in 1998.

It was built by John Lewis, a public schools administrator.
