= Dr. John Lewis House =

Historic house in Kentucky, United States

- U.S. National Register of Historic Places
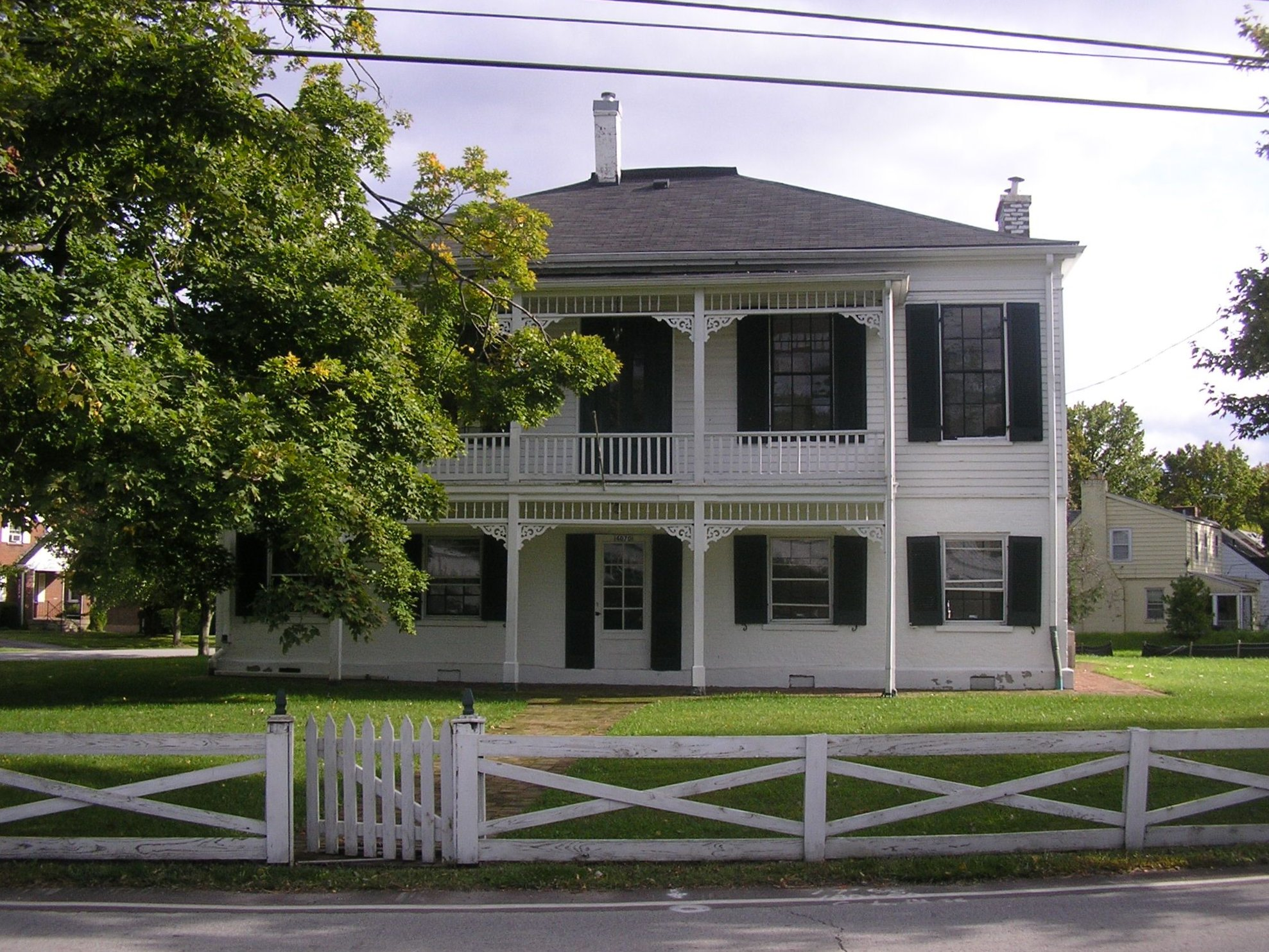

- Location within Kentucky Location within the United States
- Nearest city: St. Matthews, Kentucky
- Coordinates: 38°15′21″N 85°38′57″W
- Built: 1838
- MPS: Jefferson County MRA
- NRHP reference No.: 84001564
- Added to NRHP: April 9, 1984

Dr. John Lewis House is a house in St. Matthews, Kentucky. It was listed on the National Register of Historic Places in 1984.

It was a residence and medical offices for Dr. John Lewis. It was deemed notable as "the only surviving nineteenth-century building in this prominent location along Westport Road - an area of twentieth-century commercial development."
