= Samuel Lewis House (Mansfield, Ohio) =

Historic house in Ohio, United States

- U.S. National Register of Historic Places
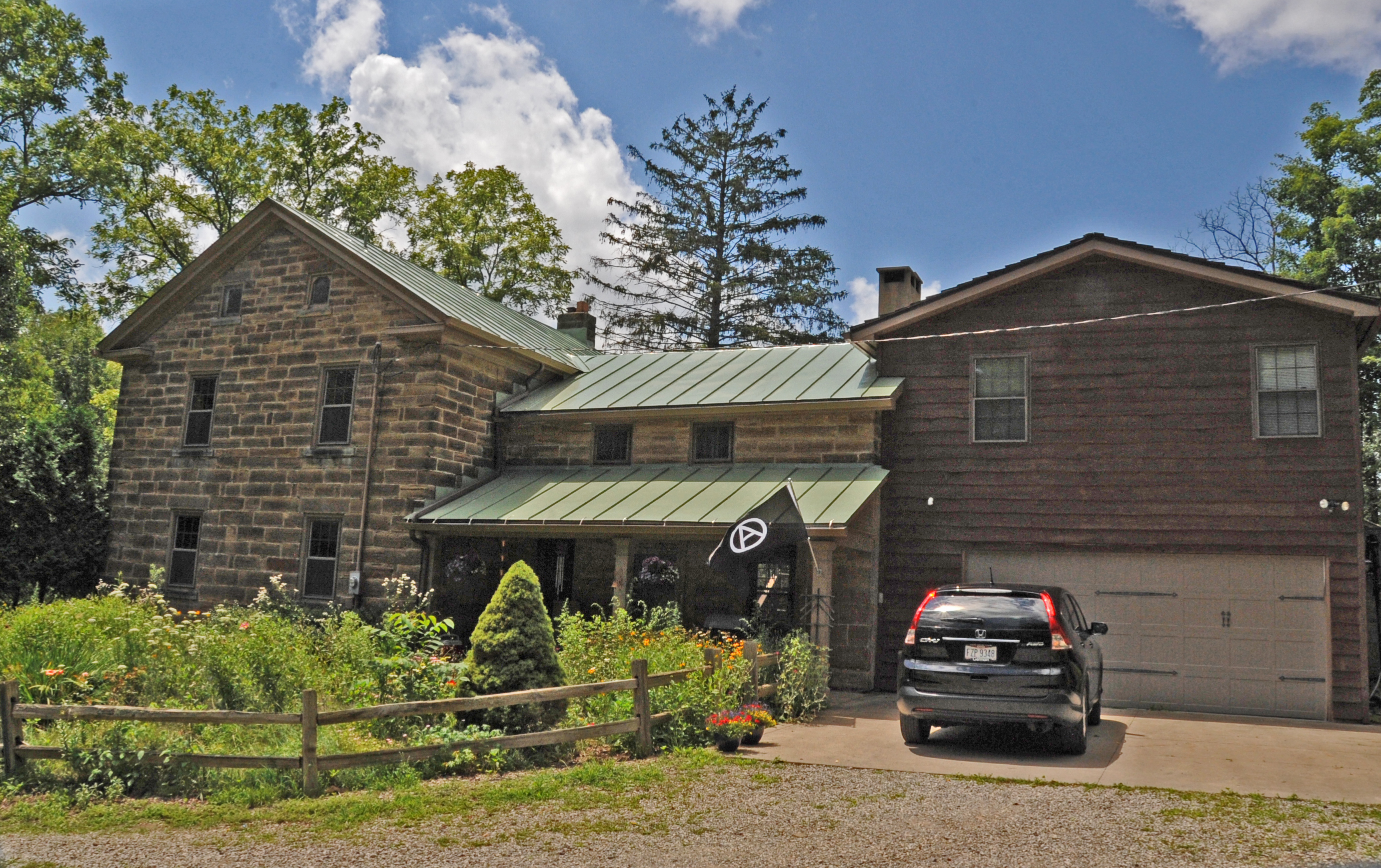

- Location within Ohio Location within the United States
- Nearest city: Mansfield, Ohio
- Coordinates: 40°45′58″N 82°28′35″W
- Built: 1837
- Architectural style: Greek Revival
- NRHP reference No.: 82003636
- Added to NRHP: June 1, 1982

Samuel Lewis House in Mansfield, Ohio is a Greek Revival building. It was listed on the National Register of Historic Places in 1982.

In 2013 it was The Olde Stone House, a bed and breakfast inn.

It is built of brown and orange-streaked sandstone from the Mansfield area, and was deemed to be the largest and best-preserved antebellum sandstone house in Richland County. It was built as a one-and-a-half-story sandstone house before 1835 when it was bought by Samuel Lewis, who expanded it in 1837.

In 2017, the inn was reopened under new management and a new name. It currently operates as "The Safe House Bed and Breakfast." The owners, Christina and Jake Simpkins, purchased the property in 2015.
