= Isaac C. Lewis Cottage =

Historic house in Connecticut, United States

- U.S. National Register of Historic Places
- U.S. Historic district – Contributing property
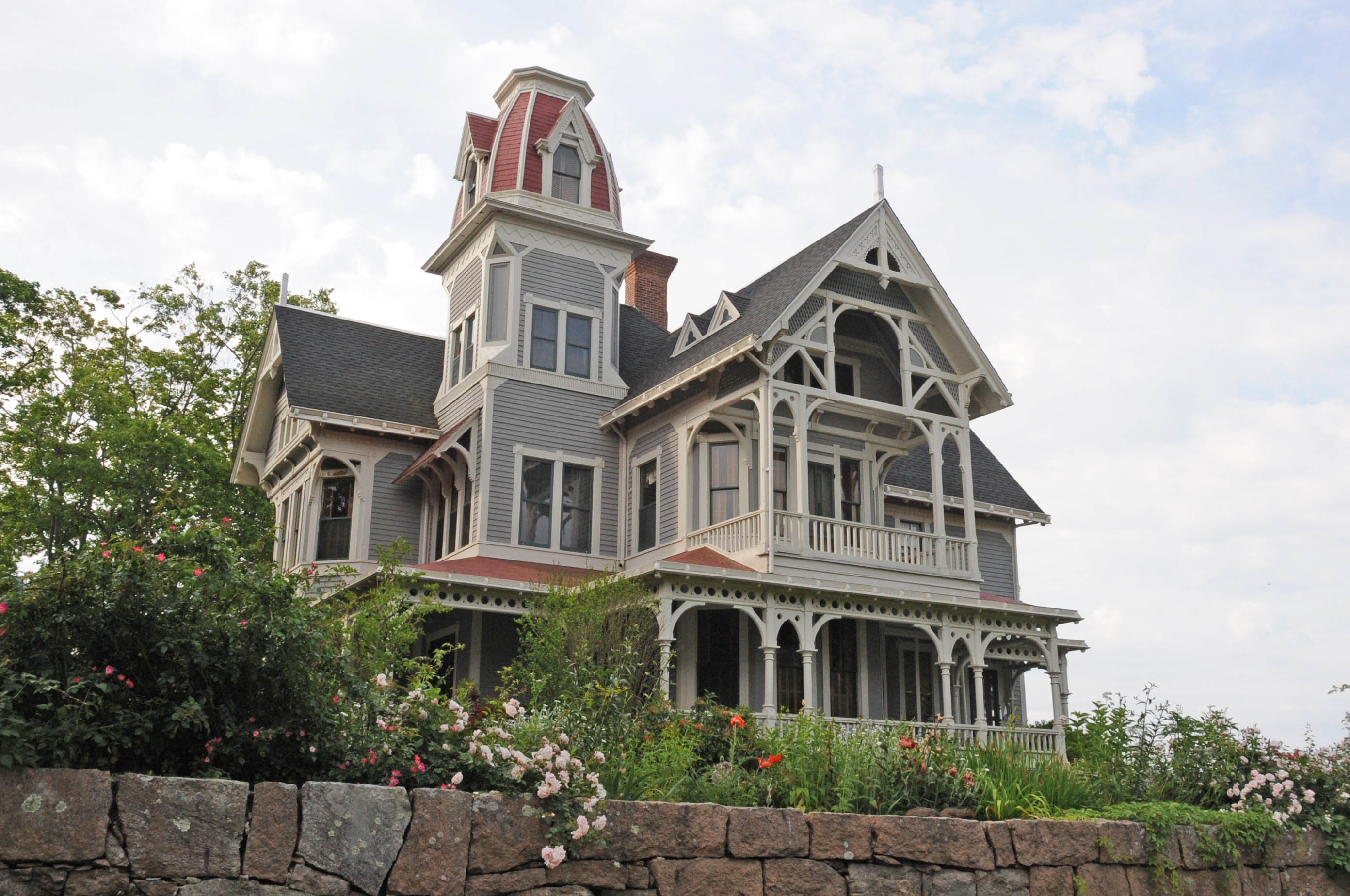
- House in 2016

- Location within Connecticut Location within the United States
- Location: 255 Thimble Islands Road, Branford, Connecticut
- Coordinates: 41°15′47″N 72°44′58″W
- Area: 1 acre (0.40 ha)
- Built: 1882
- Architect: Jones, Henry Martin
- Architectural style: Gothic, Stick/Eastlake
- Part of: Stony Creek-Thimble Islands Historic District (ID88002844)
- NRHP reference No.: 97000811

Significant dates
- Added to NRHP: July 25, 1997
- Designated CP: December 16, 1988

The Isaac C. Lewis Cottage is a historic house at 255 Thimble Islands Road in Branford, Connecticut. Built in 1882, it is a well-preserved example of an eclectically styled Victorian seaside summer house. The house was included in the Stony Creek-Thimble Islands Historic District in 1988, and separately listed on the National Register of Historic Places in 1997.

== Description and history ==
The Isaac C. Lewis Cottage is located in Branford's Thimble Islands summer resort area, at the south corner of Thimble Island Road and Linden Point Road. It is an architecturally eclectic 2 1/2-story Late Victorian structure, exhibiting a mix of elements drawn from the Second Empire, Gothic Revival, and Stick Style. Its exterior is clad in a combination of finishes, including board-and-batten siding, fish-scale wood shingles, and clapboards. Its dominant feature is a mansard-roofed tower. The interior is as elaborately detailed as the exterior, and includes hand-painted ceilings.

The house was built in 1882 as an oceanside summer house by Isaac C. Lewis, a manufacturer of silver products in Meriden. It was designed by Henry Martin Jones, a Meriden architect who also designed Lewis's Chateau-style city residence. Jones was probably trained by Henry Austin; while this is one of his more playful designs, it clearly shows elements that Austin also used in designs. The design is a mix of academically correct elements (for example, in some of its Gothic elements), but also includes more vernacular features such as sawtooth shingling.

== See also ==
- National Register of Historic Places listings in New Haven County, Connecticut
