= Longridge (disambiguation) =

Longridge is a town in Lancashire, England.

Longridge may also refer to:

== People ==
- Longridge (surname)

== Places ==
- Longridge, County Tyrone, a townland in County Tyrone, Northern Ireland
- Longridge, Gloucestershire, a location in England
- Longridge, Staffordshire, a location in England
- Longridge, West Lothian, Scotland
- Longridge Head, a headland on the Antarctic Peninsula

== Other uses ==
- R. B. Longridge and Company, a former steam locomotive works
- Longridge Towers School, Berwick-upon-Tweed, England

== See also ==
- Long Ridge (disambiguation)
- Longbridge (disambiguation)
- Longridge railway station (disambiguation)
