= Long Bridge =

Long Bridge may refer to:

== Bridges ==
=== Denmark ===
- Langebro (Long Bridge), Copenhagen

=== United Kingdom ===
- Barnstaple Long Bridge, Devon
- Bideford Long Bridge, Devon
- Long Bridge, a former bridge in the location of the present Queen's Bridge, Belfast

=== United States ===
- Long Bridge (Potomac River), one of the 14th Street Bridges in Washington, D.C.
- Huey P. Long Bridge (Baton Rouge) in Baton Rouge, Louisiana
- Huey P. Long Bridge (Jefferson Parish) in Jefferson Parish, Louisiana (near New Orleans)
- Sarah Mildred Long Bridge between Portsmouth, New Hampshire and Kittery, Maine

=== Serbia ===
- Long Bridge, Belgrade, the oldest permanent bridge in Belgrade, built in 1688

== Towns ==
- Long Bridge, in Lafayette Parish, Louisiana, United States

== See also ==
- Long–Allen Bridge (disambiguation), several bridges named for Huey P. Long and Oscar K. Allen
- Longbridge (disambiguation)
- Uzunköprü Bridge, Turkey
