= Long Ridge =

Long Ridge can refer to:

- Long Ridge (San Mateo County, California)
- Long Ridge, Danbury, Connecticut
- Long Ridge Village Historic District, Stamford, Connecticut
- Long Ridge Mall, in Greece, New York
- The Long Ridge portion of Mount Osmond, South Australia

== See also ==
- Long Ridge Road (disambiguation)
- Longridge (disambiguation)
