= Longbridge (disambiguation) =

Longbridge is an area of Birmingham, England.

Longbridge may also refer to the following places in England:

- Longbridge Deverill, Wiltshire, a village and civil parish
- Longbridge Interchange, junction 15 of the M40 motorway
- Longbridge plant, an industrial site in Birmingham
- Longbridge railway station, Birmingham
- Longbridge (Barking and Dagenham ward), London

== See also ==
- Long Bridge (disambiguation)
- Longridge (disambiguation)
