= Long Bridge (Potomac River) =

Bridge series between Washington, D.C. and Virginia

There have been three bridges named the Long Bridge connecting Washington, D.C., to Arlington, Virginia, over the Potomac River.

The first bridge at the site opened in 1809 for foot, horse, and stagecoach traffic. It was briefly converted for railroad traffic in 1862 due to the Civil War, but the tracks were moved to a new companion bridge in 1865. Both bridges were damaged in an 1870 flood and demolished in 1872.

The replacement was a single new bridge with both a roadway and a railway that opened in 1872. Despite its design, it had problems with river ice and was itself demolished in 1907.

The current bridge was built in 1904. It was substantially modified in 1942 by completely replacing the bridge deck except for the moveable span, and adding new piers among the old ones. It currently carries CSX Transportation's RF&P Subdivision, which is used by Amtrak intercity trains and Virginia Railway Express commuter trains as well as freight trains. Norfolk Southern Railway also has trackage rights on the bridge but as of 2016 does not currently exercise those rights.

In 2019, Virginia announced that it would help fund and build a new rail bridge parallel to the existing one to double its capacity. Construction of the companion bridge began in October 2024.

== First bridge (1809–1870) ==
Long Bridge
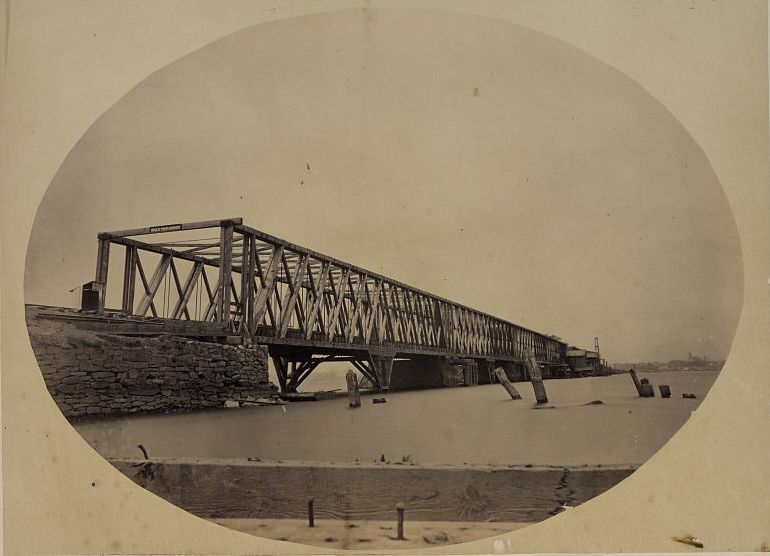
- The Washington or Long Bridge seen from the shores of the Potomac River in Northern Virginia in 1861
- Coordinates: 38.87477°N 77.03847°W
- Carries: Pedestrians, horses, carriages, railroad
- Crosses: Potomac River
- Locale: Washington, D.C., U.S.
- Other name(s): Washington Bridge, Long Bridge across the Potomac, Potomac Bridge
- Owner: Washington Bridge Company, U.S. federal government
- Maintained by: Baltimore and Ohio Railroad

Characteristics
- Material: Timber
- Total length: 5,000 ft (1,500 m)

Rail characteristics
- No. of tracks: 1

History
- Opened: 1809
- Rebuilt: 1863

Location
- Interactive map of Long Bridge

The first bridge at this location was the "Washington Bridge", a wooden toll bridge. The Washington Bridge Company was authorized on February 5, 1808, by the District Commissioners and an Act of Congress with the purpose of shortening the distance in the country's main mail route. President Thomas Jefferson signed it into law soon after. It was built to provide foot, horse and stagecoach traffic to Washington City. It was the second bridge to cross the Potomac in the District of Columbia, following a 1797 span at a narrower crossing near Little Falls, upstream of Georgetown, at the site of the present Chain Bridge. At the time it opened and also in the official documents, it was referred to as Washington Bridge, Potomac Bridge or simply "the Bridge" but by the 1830s it began to be called the "long Bridge across the Potomac" to distinguish it from the shorter bridge near Little Falls. Over time, the colloquial name was shortened to just "Long Bridge".

Built as a timber pile structure with two draw spans, it connected the city of Washington to Alexandria County. The bridge opened to traffic on May 20, 1809, and, at 5,000 ft (1,500 m) long or a mile including the abutments, was the longest bridge in the United States at the time. On the city of Washington side, it landed at the end of Maryland Avenue SW near 14th Street SW. Before the bridge was built, only a ferryboat connected the city of Washington and Alexandria County. The ferryboat ride made for a treacherous crossing when the river froze as the river was very wide. The bridge was 36 ft (11 m) wide, with 29 ft (8.8 m) for the broad carriageway in the center. The rest was for walkways on each side, protected from center traffic by a guardrail. It was built on 201 piers, with 20 lamps, a 25 ft (7.6 m) wide draw on one side and a 35 ft (11 m) wide one on the other. A 100 ft-long (30 m) wharf was constructed near one of the draws.

A board of commissioners oversaw the subscription of stocks to raise capital for the build, not to exceed $200,000, equal to $4,031,250 today.

A toll was put in place with prices set by Congress and posted at the bridge for up to 60 years after opening:

- Foot passenger: 6 1/4 cents _{(equivalent to $1.29 in 2025)}
- Person and horse: 18 3/4 cents _{(equivalent to $3.86 in 2025)}
- Chaise, sulky or riding chair: 37 1/2 cents _{(equivalent to $7.72 in 2025)}
- Coach, coachee, stage-wagon, chariot, phaeton or curricle or other riding carriage: 100 cents with an additional 12 1/2 cents for each horse or other animal (more than two) pulling the carriage _{(equivalent to $20.59 with an additional $2.57 each in 2025)}
- Four-wheeled cart, dray or other two-wheeled carriage of burthen: 18 3/4 cents with an additional 12 1/2 cents for each horse or other animal (more than one) pulling the cart _{(equivalent to $3.86 with an additional $2.57 each in 2025)}
- Sheep or swine: 3 cents each (Only one person per team or drove passes for free) _{(equivalent to $0.62 in 2025)}
- Horse or neat cattle not pulling a coach or cart or with a rider: 6 1/4 cents (Only one person per team or drove passes for free) _{(equivalent to $1.29 in 2025)}

No toll was to be collected for:

- Vehicles and passengers with property of the United States
- Troops of the United States, Militia, state, or District of Columbia marching in a body, any cannon or equipment belonging to the United States

On August 24, 1814, following the Battle of Bladensburg during the War of 1812 the President, officers of the country and American troops used it to retreat to Virginia and burnt the south end of the bridge behind them. The next day, British troops burned the north end of the bridge as they entered the City of Washington. The bridge was repaired by 1818.

=== Purchase by the federal government ===
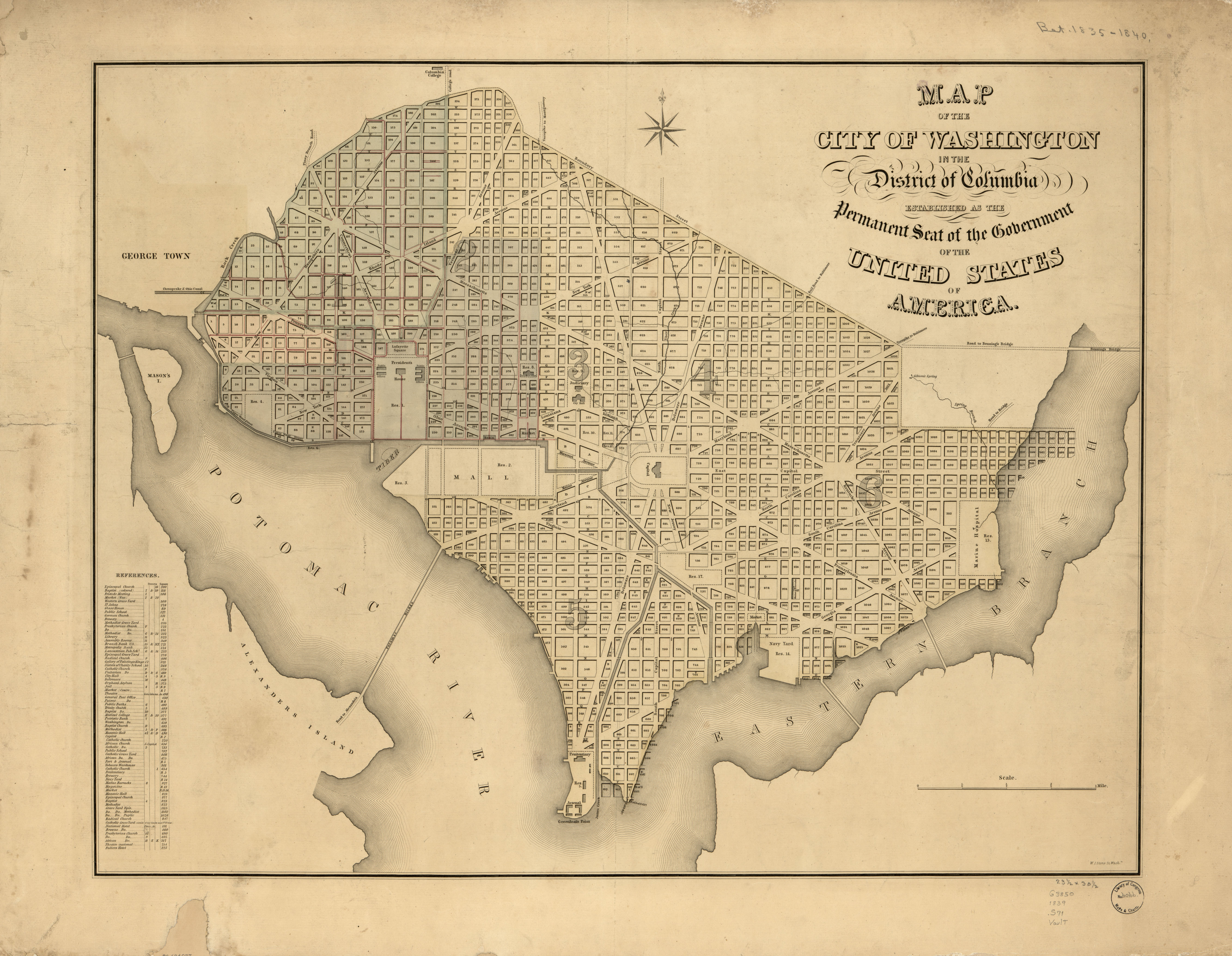
Map showing the Potomac Bridge in 1839

On February 22, 1831, high water and ice carried away several spans of the bridge, leading to closure and bankruptcy of the bridge company. The following year, Congress purchased the bridge for $20,000 (equal to $604,688 today), and appropriated $60,000 to repair it. However, more funds would be needed to complete the project and the total cost was $114,126.

On October 30, 1835, the bridge was reopened with President Andrew Jackson and his Cabinet present. It was to remain in that state until the mid-1850s. In March 1847, the Virginia Assembly voted to formally accept the retrocession of Alexandria and Arlington, and thus the south approach of the bridge became part of Virginia.

After 1835, the B&O Railroad was provided access to Washington City through the Northeast quadrant. There were several attempts to bring the railroad to Alexandria City. The A&W Railroad connected the B&O Railroad New Jersey Avenue Station located on Capitol Hill to the Long Bridge on the north shore by 1855 and in Alexandria by the end of 1857. However, the Virginia legislature had banned any other connections and tracks were not placed on the bridge. Goods were offloaded, transported over the bridge in omnibuses over the bridge and reloaded on the other side.

=== Civil War ===
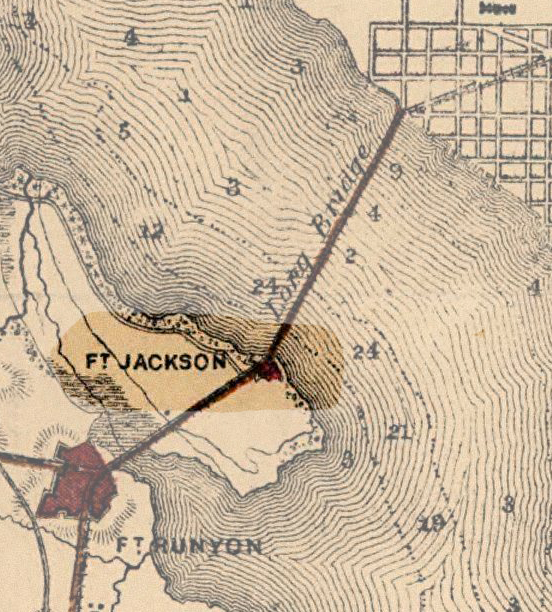
Fort Jackson and Long Bridge on an 1865 map

In 1860, the President of the B&O company had requested, and been denied, permission to reinforce or replace the bridge. The beginning of the Civil War in 1861, and the secession of the state of Virginia on May 23, 1861, made the military value of the bridge evident. On May 25, 1861, 13,000 Union troops moved in to take control of the bridge along with Alexandria and its railroad. Under the command of Colonel John G. Barnard, Fort Jackson (Virginia) was built to guard the bridge to avoid the passage of spies and invasion by the Confederates with four cannons present in the fort.

Competition between railroads became sharper in the District of Columbia, Maryland and Virginia, as the Pennsylvania Railroad sought to break B&O's monopoly in the District. Local and federal politics along with personal interests of politicians made it possible for the newcomer to gain access to the city. Pennsylvania Senator Simon Cameron, a stockholder in the PRR-owned Northern Central Railroad, served as Secretary of War from 1861 to 1862, when he was fired due to charges of payoffs and other irregularities, and helped the railroad gain control of the bridge. The PRR was financing the Baltimore and Potomac Railroad (B&P) to get in the District.

At the direction of the military in early 1862, new tracks were laid for the approaches, the rail bed was repaired and tracks were laid across the bridge. The new connection opened on February 9, 1862. On February 11, 1862, Daniel McCallum was appointed Military Director and Superintendent of the Union railroads, with the staff rank of colonel, by Secretary of War Edwin M. Stanton. McCallum had authority to "enter upon, take possession of, hold and use all railroads, engines, cars, locomotives, and equipment that may be required for the transport of troops, arms, ammunition, and military supplies of the United States, and to do and perform all acts... that may be necessary and proper... for the safe and speedy transport aforesaid," he wrote in an 1866 report. It quickly became obvious the structure would not be able to withstand heavy loads. Lightly loaded railroad cars were transshipped over the bridge and pulled by horses.

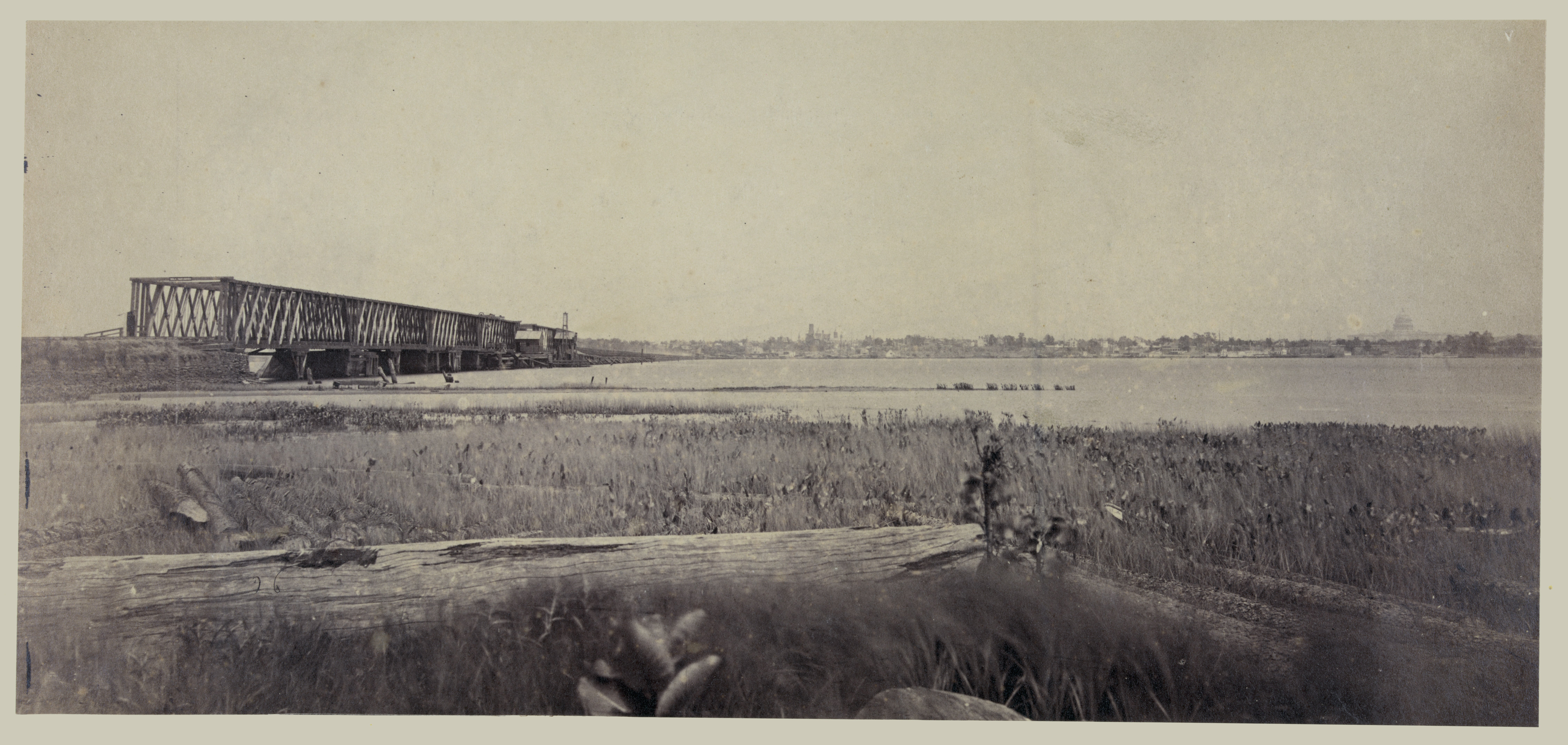
Long Bridge in 1863 looking toward Washington, DC

=== Companion railroad bridge (1864-1872) ===
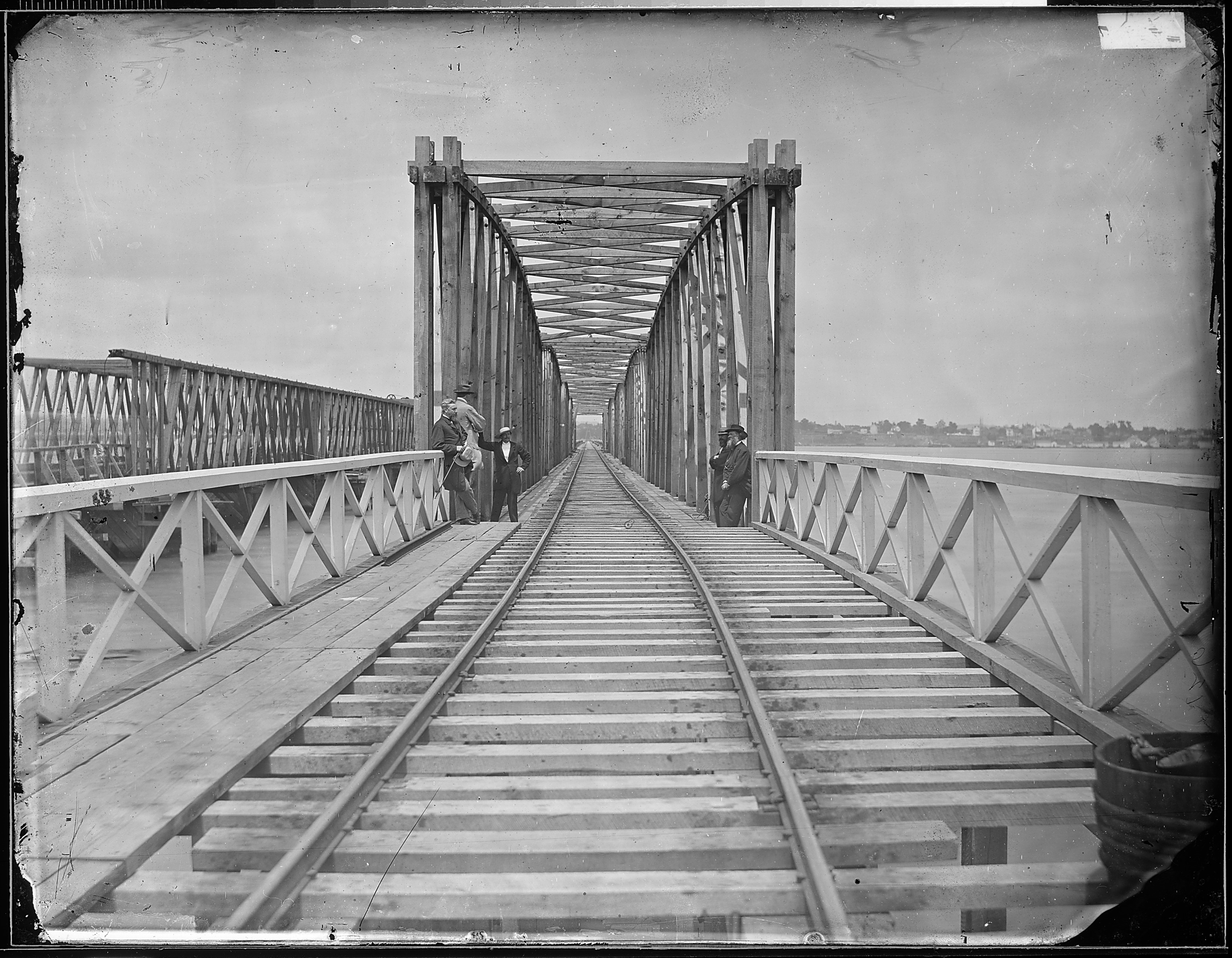
The new span after rails were moved to it in 1865

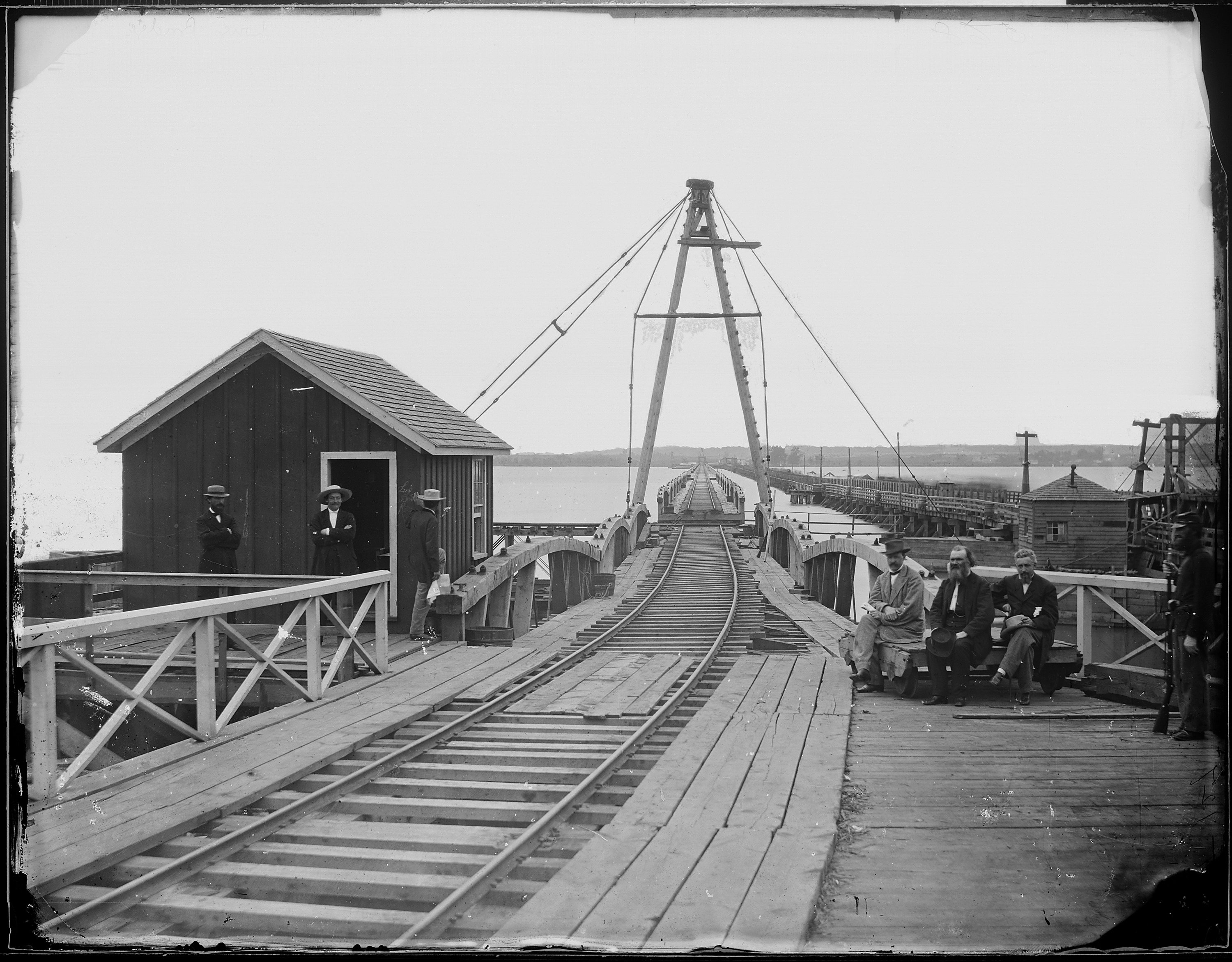
General Daniel McCallum (with the beard) at the Long Bridge, now with two spans, looking toward Alexandria

On July 23, 1864, a new, stronger bridge, built by the Washington, Alexandria and Georgetown Railroad Company was completed about 100 feet (30 m) downriver. Work on the 5,104 ft-long (1,556 m) bridge began in June 1863 and built a bridge with 203 spans and two 82 ft-long (25 m) draws, completed without rails. On February 18, 1865, the U.S. Military railroad engine Charles Minot was crossing the old bridge when its weight caused the span to fail. The failure was such that the military decided it was easier and important enough to take possession of the new bridge and install rail on it than repair the old one. The rails were moved to the new bridge - which was then called Railroad Bridge - and the old bridge - then Turnpike Bridge - became used for non-rail traffic only, as had been recommended in the prior year.

Railroad Bridge opened on February 21, 1865, and carried only railroad traffic. On November 15, 1865, with the end of the war, the U.S. Military Railroad gave the bridge to the U.S. Department of the Interior and the new bridge became part of the Washington, Alexandria and Georgetown Railroad, leased by the B&O.

Sometimes the two bridges were referred to separately as the Long Bridge and the railroad bridge and at others as two parts of one "Long Bridge".

During the war, wounded Union soldiers were carried across the bridge to hospitals set up all over the city. The closest was Armory Square Hospital, a few blocks from the bridge.

=== Flood damage and demolition ===
An October 1, 1870, flood damaged both the Turnpike Bridge and Railroad Bridge existing bridges beyond repair, with much of the causeway, wooden superstructure and spans carried away. Railroad Bridge was partially repaired and continued to be used until it was closed the day the new bridge opened, May 14, 1872. It was then removed in late 1872.

== Second bridge (1872–1906) ==
Long Bridge
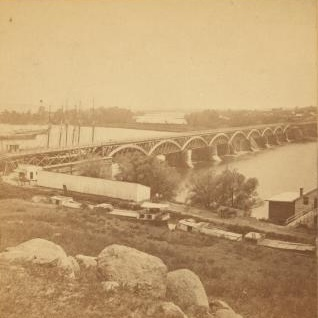
- The second Long Bridge in the 1870s or 1880s
- Coordinates: 38.87477°N 77.03847°W
- Carries: Pedestrians, horses, vehicles, railroad, streetcars
- Crosses: Potomac River
- Locale: Washington, D.C., U.S.
- Other name: Turnpike Bridge

Characteristics
- Material: Timber
- Total length: 4,680 ft (1,430 m)

History
- Opened: 1872
- Rebuilt: 1884

Location
- Interactive map of Long Bridge

Prior to the flood, the Baltimore and Potomac Railroad Company had been given the rights to the bridges on the condition that they maintain them. Immediately following the flood they chose to build a replacement bridge which they worked on from November 1870 until it opened on May 15, 1872. The new bridge was 36 ft (11 m) wide with both a carriageway and a railway, 9 ft (2.7 m) above the water, and nearly a mile long with solid abutments built of sandstone from Freestone Point and blue gneiss from the quarries above Georgetown. The draws were 61 and 96 ft (19 and 29 m) long. The bridge had three parts, a 700 ft-long (210 m) bridge over the Washington Channel, a 2,000 ft-long (610 m) bridge over the Virginia Channel and a 1,980 ft-long (600 m) earth causeway between masonry walls on the flats between the channels.

On July 2, 1872, the Alexandria and Fredericksburg Railway opened, providing the first direct all-rail connection between the north and Richmond, Virginia.

Despite the new design the 1872 bridge continued to be damaged by freshets, it blocked river traffic and was not wide enough for two tracks. On February 12, 1881, ice freshets damaged the bridge by taking out three spans. It re-opened for traffic on February 19, 1881 In 1884, the bridge was rebuilt and strengthened. On February 7, 1895, The Evening Star reported that the Potomac was frozen near the docks. The ice was five inches thick with an extra two inches of snow on top. The ice was being blocked by the Long Bridge. The bridge acted as a sort of dam and created conditions that could lead to a flood. It had cost the District Government $5,000 to clear the ice in 1893. Within 30 years, the railroad and regional leaders began making plans for a replacement.

On June 30, 1891, the B&P Railroad granted the Chesapeake & Ohio Railway trackage rights over the bridge to its Washington station On August 1, 1895, the B&P Railroad granted the use of the bridge to the Washington, Alexandria, and Mount Vernon Electric Railway (streetcars). Power cables were hung and the rent set to $25,000 a year.

On February 19, 1898, the Washington Terminal Railway Company incorporated in Virginia, a joint venture of the PRR, RF&P, ACL, Southern Railway and C&O but not the B&O. It acquired the property of the Washington Southern Railway, the B&P Railroad terminals in Washington and Long Bridge. Two years later, on July 31, 1900, a New Jersey holding company was formed between PRR, ACL, Southern Railway, C&O, Seaboard Air Line Railway and B&O to control the line between Richmond, VA and the Long Bridge.

In 1901, trackage rights over the bridge were obtained by the Richmond, Fredericksburg and Potomac Railroad, a bridge line owned equally by six companies including the PRR and B&O (which obtained trackage rights over the PRR to reach the bridge on July 1, 1904).

After the new railroad bridge was constructed in 1904, the 1872 Bridge remained in use for vehicles and trolley cars until the 14th Street Highway Bridge was complete. On January 11, 1906, the first streetcars used the new Highway Bridge southbound, while the northbound cars continued using the old bridge. Northbound streetcars switched on February 12, when the bridge was officially opened. Vehicles continued to use the old bridge until the Highway Bridge was completed in December 1906, making the 1872 bridge obsolete. The bridge was closed on December 18, 1906, and demolition began on January 26, 1907. On December 3, 1907, demolition was completed when markers were placed on the remaining underwater piles of riprap and piers.

== Current bridge (1904–present) ==
Long Bridge
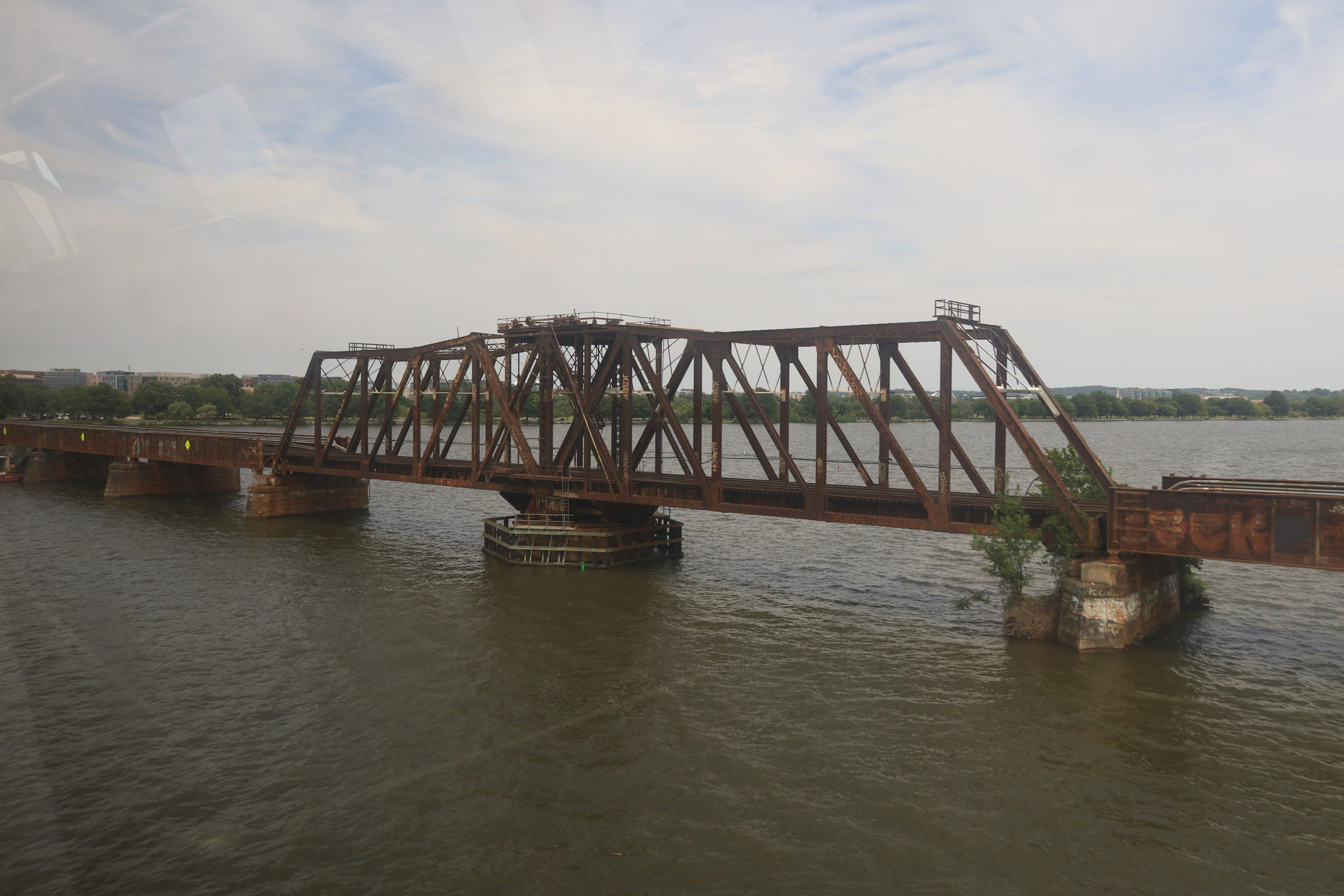
- Main truss span of the current Long Bridge, viewed from the adjacent Fenwick Bridge in 2026
- Coordinates: 38.87477°N 77.03847°W
- Carries: Railroad only (Amtrak/VRE/CSX)
- Crosses: Potomac River
- Locale: Washington, D.C., U.S.
- Other name: Railroad Bridge
- Owner: CSX, Virginia

Characteristics
- Material: Steel and timber
- Total length: 2,528.5 ft (770.7 m)
- Capacity: 96 trains per day

Rail characteristics
- No. of tracks: 2

History
- Opened: 1904
- Rebuilt: 1942

Statistics
- Daily traffic: 79 trains per day (as of 2013): 56 passenger (32 VRE, 24 Amtrak); 23 freight

Location
- Interactive map of Long Bridge

=== Construction ===
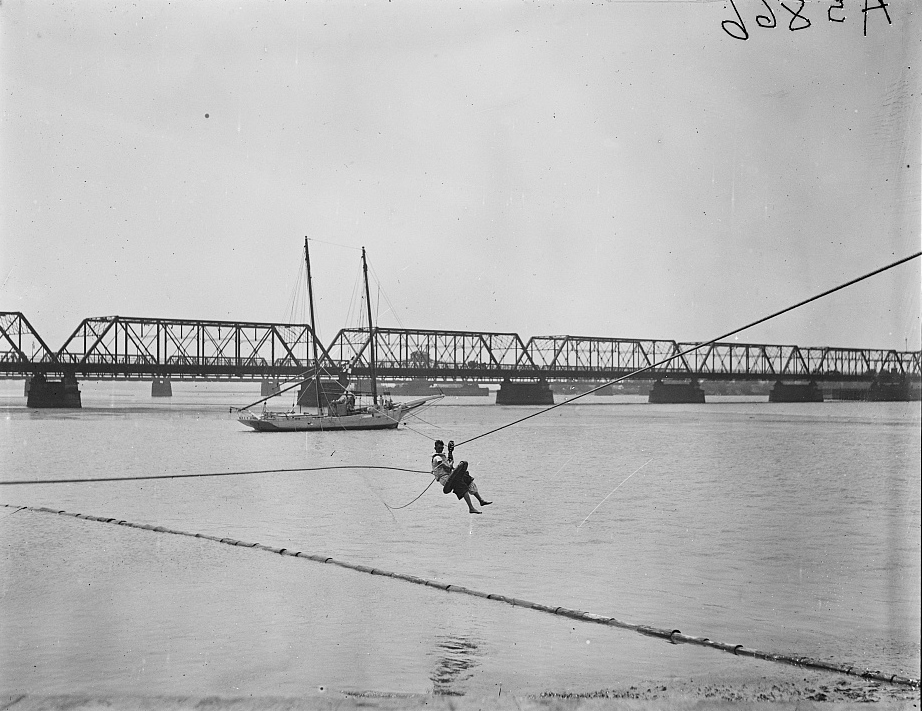
The current bridge in its original configuration in 1923

In 1899, the Pennsylvania Railroad, owner of the Baltimore and Potomac Railroad (B&P) Company and thus the bridge, began to push Congress to authorize a replacement of the 1872 Long Bridge with one that would eliminate some of its well-documented problems. They wanted one high enough for sailing vessels to pass beneath, that could serve multiple carriers and end the problems caused by freshets. They also wanted a second bridge for non-rail traffic. The new bridge they proposed would enter the city on a viaduct and, with a tunnel under Virginia Avenue, eliminate all grade-crossings as well as connect to a new Union Station. A February 12, 1901, act of Congress authorized the construction of the new double-track railroad bridge and an adjacent Highway Bridge. (The act also led to the creation of the McMillan Plan of 1902 and Union Station completed in 1907.) In April 1902 the B&P submitted plans for the railroad bridge to the Secretary of War and the board of engineers overseeing the project which were approved later that year. Also in 1902, the B&P merged with the Pennsylvania Railroad and the Philadelphia, Wilmington and Baltimore Railroad to form the Philadelphia, Baltimore and Washington Railroad.

Work on the new Railroad Bridge, a Pratt through-truss swing bridge, began in the spring of 1902, cost $750,000 and lasted more than 2 years. The new bridge opened on August 28, 1904, about 150 feet (45 m) upriver from the old bridge. The two-track bridge contained girders recycled from the PRR's Lower Trenton Bridge across the Delaware River and was painted a bright red. It was 2,528.5 ft (770.7 m) long (about 450 ft (140 m) longer than the 1872 Bridge), consisted of eleven spans on twelve stone piers and sat 27 ft (8.2 m) above the water line. It created a wider channel, 100 ft (30 m) wide, on both sides of the pivot than the old bridge did. In the early years, the bridge was often referred to as the "Railroad Bridge" to distinguish it from "Highway Bridge". It was also sometimes known as the "14th Street Railroad Bridge".

=== Reconstruction ===
In 1941, the owners began planning to reconstruct the bridge. They sought to build 11 new supplemental piers between the original truss spans and replacing the iron and steel truss spans with steel plate girders. Work on bridge reconstruction began in mid-1942 and completed on November 9, 1943. It allowed heavily loaded trains to cross at 45 miles per hour (72 kilometres per hour), whereas before they were limited to 15 mph (24 km/h) for freight and 20 mph (32 km/h) for passenger trains. The through-truss swing span was retained.

In 1955, the Commerce Department performed a study of Washington, DC area drawbridges and determined that the cost and inconvenience of maintaining the draw bridges was not worth the advantages of keeping the river navigable. The three bridges at 14th Street opened only 315 times in 1954 and cost $270,000 to operate and maintain, while also causing traffic tie-ups. Later that year, the Army Corps of Engineers, decided that Potomac River bridges upstream of Hains Point would no longer require a lift or draw span and that once the Mason Bridge was completed, the existing draws would be sealed. Construction of the Mason Bridge was completed in 1962, and the Long Bridge ceased opening except for a few exceptions. The last time it was opened was March 1969 to allow barges used in the removal of the old Highway Bridge to pass through.

=== Later history ===
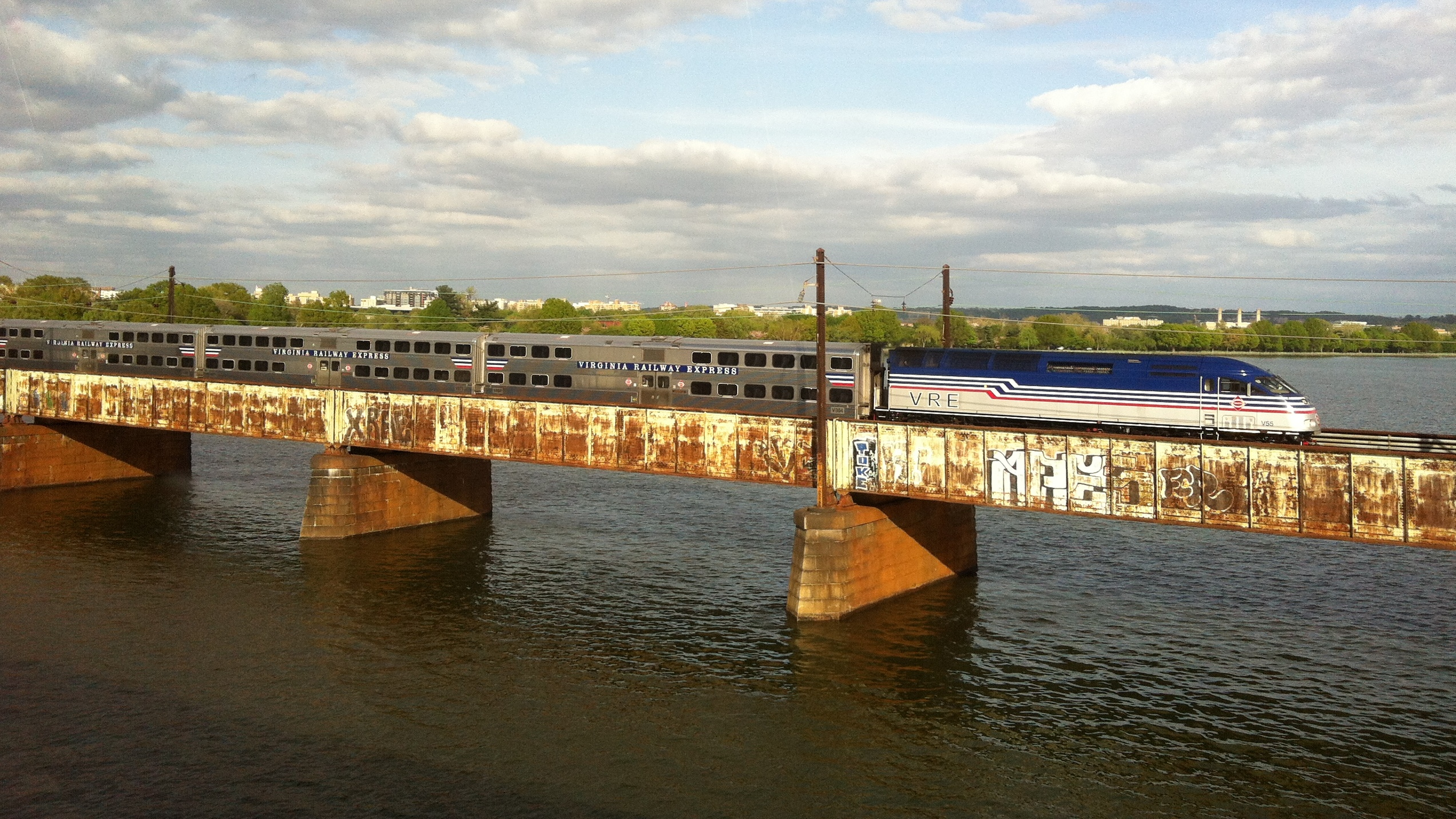
The 1904 Long Bridge (as modified in 1942) in 2013

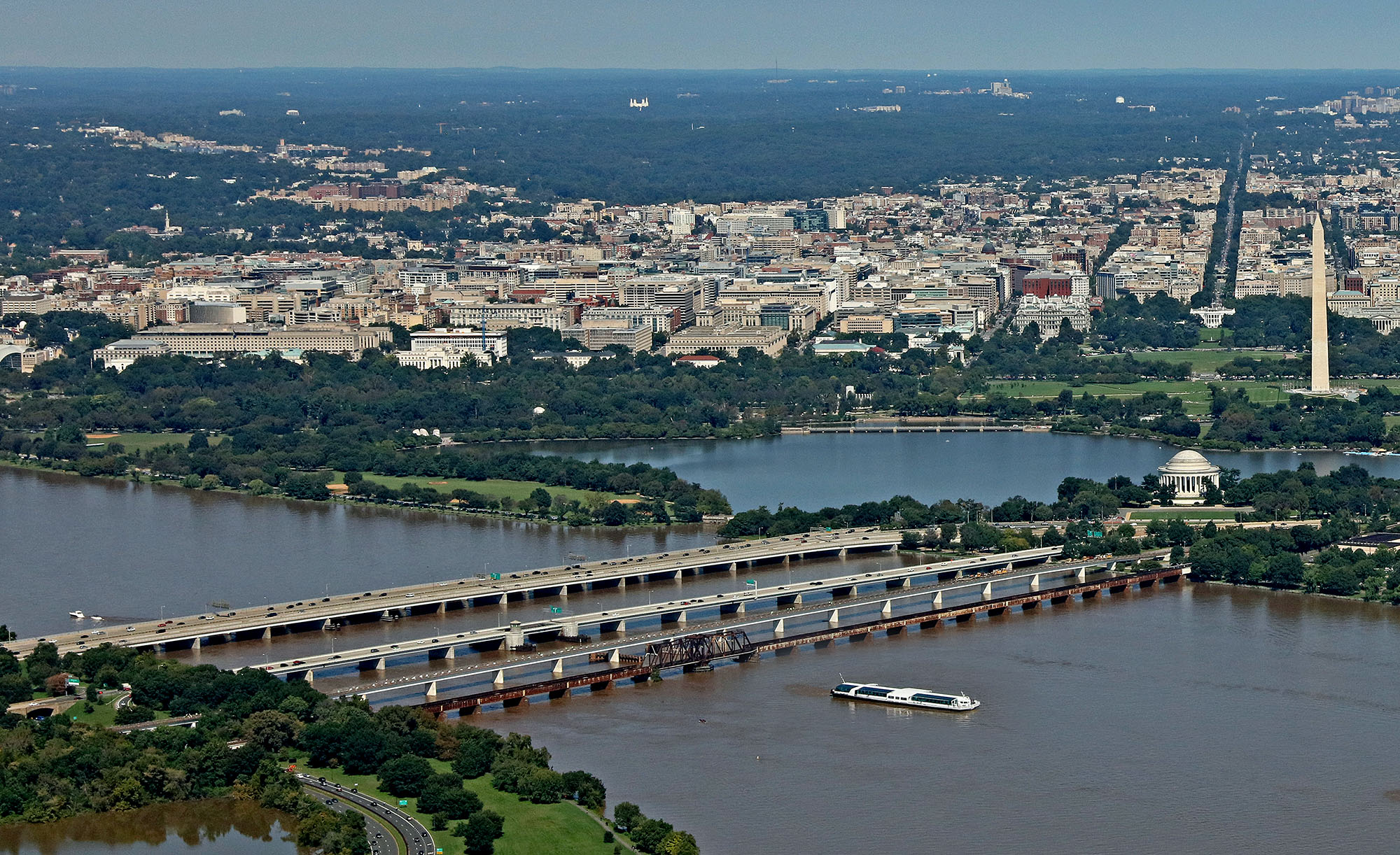
Aerial view with the Long Bridge in the foreground, looking north in 2022

Ownership of the bridge passed to Penn Central Railroad in 1968 when the Pennsylvania Railroad and its longtime rival New York Central Railroad merged. After Penn Central declared bankruptcy, the bridge was sold to the new Consolidated Rail Corporation (Conrail).

The tender's control house, or shanty, on top of the draw, which had been often used as a billboard for Georgetown crew races, was ultimately removed in late 1982 or early 1983.

In the 1980s, planners of the Virginia Railway Express (VRE) system began calling the bridge "Long Bridge" and the name stuck. VRE began using the bridge in 1992.

In 1991, the RF&P was merged into CSX Transportation, which acquired the bridge itself in 1998, after the Conrail breakup.

In 2011 the District Department of Transportation (DDOT), in coordination with the Federal Railroad Administration (FRA), began a High Speed Intercity Passenger Rail grant-funded comprehensive study for the rehabilitation or replacement of the Long Bridge. After a series of phased studies, the determined that the bridge had inadequate capacity and redundancy. The bridge was rehabilitated during 2014–2016, and CSX determined that it was sufficient to meet their freight needs.

=== New companion bridge ===
In 2019, DDOT and FRA reported that another bridge was needed to serve increased passenger rail needs, as the Long Bridge has historically been one of the worst bottlenecks in the national rail system, often operating at 98 percent capacity. DDOT also proposed to create a new bicycle/pedestrian crossing on an additional, parallel bridge.

On December 19, 2019, Virginia Governor Ralph Northam and rail company CSX Transportation announced a deal to expand rail service in Virginia. As part of the deal, Virginia will build a new two-track bridge parallel to the existing Long Bridge to be used for Amtrak and VRE trains, while the existing bridge would be renovated and used solely for freight traffic..

The Final Environmental Impact Statement and FRA's Record of Decision was issued on September 4, 2020, clearing the way for final engineering design, financing and construction of the Long Bridge expansion.

Construction of the replacement bridge began in October 2024 with a groundbreaking ceremony held on October 17. The now fully funded Long Bridge expansion is expected to be finished by 2030.

== Namesake park ==
The bridge is the namesake of Long Bridge Park, a public park that stands close to the bridge's original landing near Crystal City, Virginia, and a short distance from the Pentagon. Managed by Arlington County, the 36-acre (15-hectare) park has sports fields, walkways, and playgrounds. It is reached via Long Bridge Drive between Interstate 395 and the George Washington Memorial Parkway.

== See also ==
- 14th Street bridges
- Civil War Defenses of Washington
- Washington, D.C., in the American Civil War
- Civil War
- Confederate railroads in the American Civil War
- Fort Jackson (Virginia)
- Daniel McCallum
