= Longridge (surname) =

Longridge is a surname.

- Louis Longridge is a Scottish professional footballer who plays for Hamilton Academical
- Michael Longridge (1785–1858), founder of R. B. Longridge and Company
- Robert Bewick Longridge (1821–1914), director of R. B. Longridge and Company
- Thomas Longridge (1751–1803), partner in Bedlington Ironworks
- Sebastian Longridge (1987-2011), Pawnee miniature show horse
