= Longridge railway station =

Longridge railway station may refer to:

- Longridge railway station (England), passenger terminus of the Preston and Longridge Railway in Lancashire
- Longridge railway station (Scotland), original terminus of the Wilsontown, Morningside and Coltness Railway in West Lothian
