= Longbridge Interchange =

Location
- Sherbourne, Warwickshire
- Coordinates: 52.260068°N 1.613359°W
- Roads at junction: M40; A46; A429

Construction
- Type: Roundabout interchange
- Opened: December 1989
- Maintained by: National Highways

Location in Warwickshire
Location in UK motorway network

Longbridge Interchange (also known as Longbridge Island) is a major road and motorway junction between Warwick and Sherbourne, Warwickshire, connecting the A46 road and A429 road respectively to the M40 motorway at junction 15. For many years, it was deemed inadequate in handling the volume of traffic, which in 2009 was estimated to be in the region of 75,000 vehicles daily; a bypass was built during 2008-2009 which relieved congestion.

== Improvements ==
Work commenced in March 2008 to build a 1.8 miles (2.9 km) dual-carriageway bypass of the island, involving a four-span bridge over the M40 motorway. In December 2009, the bypass opened as part of a £71 million investment and estimated to reduce traffic at the roundabout by 40%.

During planning of the bypass in 2007, residents in the local village of Sherbourne, Warwickshire campaigned against its construction, claiming in a public enquiry that the village would suffer flooding and significantly increased traffic as a result of the bypass. The Highways Agency received 72 written objections to the original proposals, although there was considerable public support for an alternate proposal which involved the bypass being built 400 metres (1,300 ft) to the west. The alternate proposal received the backing of the parish council and many landowners affected by the scheme.

== Road safety ==
Prior to the bypass, there were a reported 68 accidents at the interchange in the four years up to 2009.
