= Long Ridge Road =

Long Ridge Road can refer to:

- County Route 3 (Westchester County, New York), named Long Ridge Road
- State C166, a highway in Australia named Long Ridge Road
