= John G. Barnard =

US Army general and polymath (1815–1882)

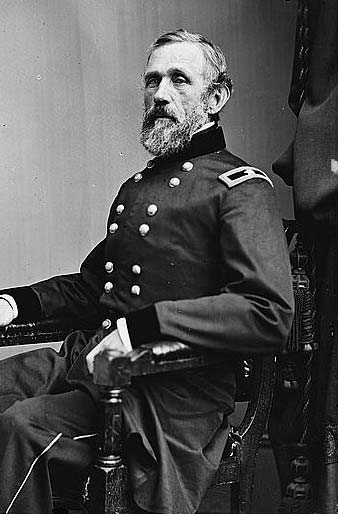
- Born: May 19, 1815; Sheffield, Massachusetts, U.S.
- Died: May 14, 1882 (aged 66); Detroit, Michigan, U.S.
- Burial place: Barnard Cemetery; Sheffield, Massachusetts
- Military career
- Allegiance: United States of America; Union
- Branch: United States Army; Union Army
- Service years: 1833–1881
- Rank: Colonel; Brigadier General; Brevet Major General
- Commands: Superintendent, U.S. Military Academy; Chief Engineer, Department of Washington; Chief Engineer, Army of the Potomac; Chief Engineer, U.S. Field Armies
- Conflicts: Mexican–American War; American Civil War; Manassas campaign; Battle of Blackburn's Ford; First Battle of Bull Run; Peninsula campaign; Siege of Yorktown; Battle of Williamsburg; Battle of Gaines' Mill; Battle of White Oak Swamp; Battle of Malvern Hill; Overland Campaign; Siege of Petersburg; Capture of Fort Harrison; Battle of Hatcher's Run; Appomattox campaign; Third Battle of Petersburg

Signature
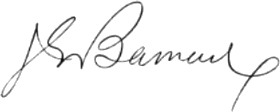

John Gross Barnard (May 19, 1815 – May 14, 1882) was a career engineer officer in the U.S. Army, serving in the Mexican–American War, as the superintendent of the United States Military Academy and as a general in the Union Army during the American Civil War. He served as Chief Engineer of the Army of the Potomac, 1861 to 1862, Chief Engineer of the Department of Washington from 1861 to 1864, and as Chief Engineer of the armies in the field from 1864 to 1865. He was also a distinguished scientist, engineer, mathematician, historian and author.

== Early life and career ==
John G. Barnard was born into a large and gifted family in Sheffield, Massachusetts. His brother, Frederick Augustus Porter Barnard was a longtime educator and president of Columbia University and namesake of Barnard College in New York City. Both John and Frederick, as well as most members of their family, suffered from a hereditary form of deafness which intensified in later years. In early life, when stationed in New Orleans, Barnard married Jane Elizabeth Brand, of Maryland, with whom he had four children. In 1860, he married Anna E. Hall of Harford County, Maryland, with whom he had three children.

In 1833, at the age of 18, Barnard graduated from the United States Military Academy at West Point, New York, second in a class of forty-three cadets. As one of the top graduates of his class, he was posted as a Second Lieutenant in the United States Army Corps of Engineers, embarking on a 48-year career in that branch.

Barnard's first assignment after being commissioned was as an assistant to Colonel Joseph G. Totten in constructing Fort Adams in Newport, Rhode Island, from 1833 to 1834. Totten was the foremost American military engineer of his day and served as Chief Engineer of the Army for much of Barnard's career. There, the two formed a close friendship as evidenced by Barnard's extensive eulogy of Totten, which was published in 1866.

Throughout his career, Barnard served on many garrison and fortification details, most notably participating in the construction of coastal defenses at Fort Columbus/Fort Jay, Fort Hamilton and Fort Wadsworth in New York City, New Orleans, Pensacola, Mobile, Fort Livingston, Louisiana, Fort Jackson, Louisiana, Fort St. Philip, Louisiana and on the Pacific Coast at San Francisco. During the Mexican–American War, he headed the construction of American defenses at the captured Mexican port of Tampico, ensuring that city's safety as a vital supply line for American forces advancing on Mexico City. He also worked on the survey of Mexican–American War battlefields. and as chief engineer for the Exploration and Survey of the projected Tehuantepec Railroad in Mexico, in 1850–1851.

From May 31, 1855, through September 8, 1856, Barnard served as the Superintendent of the United States Military Academy, succeeding Robert E. Lee. He then returned to work on coastal defenses, especially in the New York and New Jersey area. During a leave of absence, he studied construction projects in Europe.

== Civil War ==
Soon after the outbreak of the Civil War, U.S. Army commander Major General and Brevet Lieutenant General Winfield Scott, bearing in mind Barnard's success at defending his Tampico-based supply lines during the Mexican–American War, assigned then Major Barnard to the Department of Washington. This was the Union Army unit in charge of defending Washington, D.C., the capital of the United States. On April 28, 1861, Colonel Joseph K. Mansfield, the department commander, a former engineer himself, attached Barnard to his headquarters as chief engineer.

When the Union Army moved into Northern Virginia on May 24, 1861, Barnard oversaw the erection of fortifications on the Arlington hills. He also accompanied the Army to Manassas in July 1861 and was present at the Union defeat at the First Battle of Bull Run (Manassas). Between June 1861 and September 1861, Barnard also served on the U.S. Navy's Blockade Strategy Board. Major General George B. McClellan assumed command of the Military Division of the Potomac, the troops around Washington, D.C., on July 23, 1861. On August 15, 1861, McClellan was appointed to the command of the Army and Department of the Potomac, and Barnard became chief engineer of the Military District of Washington. As McClellan formulated his thoughts for fortifications around Washington, D.C., Barnard planned, designed and oversaw their construction.

In Barnard's A Report on the Defenses of Washington, published after the Civil War, he commented on the complexity and ever-changing nature of the project:

From a few isolated works covering bridges or commanding a few especially important points, was developed a connected system of fortification by which every prominent point, at intervals of 800 to 1,000 yards, was occupied by an inclosed field-fort every important approach or depression of ground, unseen from the forts, swept by a battery for field-guns, and the whole connected by rifle-trenches which were in fact lines of infantry parapet, furnishing emplacement for two ranks of men and affording covered communication along the line, while roads were opened wherever necessary, so that troops and artillery could be moved rapidly from one point of the immense periphery to another, or under cover, from point to point along the line.

On September 23, 1861, President Abraham Lincoln appointed Barnard to the grade of brigadier general, U.S. Volunteers, to rank from September 23, 1861. Lincoln formally nominated Barnard as brigadier general on December 21, 1861, and the U.S. Senate confirmed the promotion on March 24, 1862. Barnard was engineer for the Army of the Potomac between August 20, 1861, and August 16, 1862. He participated in the Peninsula Campaign and directed the siege works at Yorktown, Virginia and later the offensive and defensive works on the Chickahominy River. On the march to Harrison's Landing on the James River, he reconnoitered and selected positions for the Battle of Gaines Mill, the passage of White Oak Swamp and the Battle of Malvern Hill. After the conclusion of his work in that campaign, he again was engaged in working on the defenses of Washington as chief engineer of the Department of Washington until May 1864. He had certain additional special assignments, such as devising the defenses of Pittsburgh, Pennsylvania, during this period.

Upon the death of the Chief of the U. S. Army Corps of Engineers, Brigadier General Joseph Totten, on April 22, 1864, President Lincoln nominated Barnard to be the next Chief of the U.S. Army Corps of Engineers at the grade of brigadier general, U.S. Army, but Barnard immediately asked that the nomination be withdrawn.

Barnard was Engineer XXII Corps, Department of Washington, between February 2, 1863, and May 25, 1864. Between May 25, 1864, and June 5, 1864, he was chief engineer for the Army of the Potomac. He was on the staff of General Ulysses S. Grant in the Overland Campaign between June 5, 1864, and July 4, 1864. On July 4, 1864, President Lincoln nominated and the U. S. Senate confirmed the award to General Barnard of the honorary rank of brevet major general, U.S. Volunteers, to rank from July 4, 1864, for "Meritorious and Distinguished Services during the Rebellion."

Barnard was appointed chief engineer of the armies in the field with his appointment to General Grant's staff. He remained in this position during the Siege of Petersburg, including the capture of Fort Harrison, the Battle of Hatcher's Run and the final assault on Petersburg, until the surrender of the Army of Northern Virginia at Appomattox, Virginia, on April 9, 1865.

General Barnard served in the honor guard for President Lincoln's funeral in April 1865. He was mustered out of the U.S. Volunteers on January 15, 1866.

On April 10, 1866, President Andrew Johnson nominated and on May 4, 1866, the U.S. Senate confirmed the award to Barnard of the honorary grade of brevet brigadier general, USA, (Regular Army) to rank from March 13, 1865, for "Gallant and Meritorious Service in the Campaign terminating with the Surrender of the Insurgent Army under Gen. R. E. Lee." On July 17, 1866, President Johnson nominated and on July 23, 1866, the U.S. Senate confirmed the award to Barnard of the honorary grade of brevet major general, USA, to rank from March 13, 1865 "for Gallant and Meritorious Services in the Field during the Rebellion."

== Postbellum career ==
Barnard was promoted to colonel in the Regular Army on December 28, 1865, and continued his career in the Army Corps of Engineers until January 1881.

Soon after the close of the war, Barnard was made president of the permanent Board of Engineers for Fortifications and River and Harbor Improvements, a position which he held until his retirement from active service, in January, 1881. Barnard successfully recast the approach to coastal defenses which was required because of the obsolescence of wooden ships and muzzle loading guns. He also advocated the successful use of parallel jetties to improve the mouth of the Mississippi River. He was a prominent member of the United States Lighthouse Board from February 20, 1870, until his retirement on January 2, 1881.

The production of scientific literature in the USA was fostered by Barnard: It was largely through the influence of General Barnard that David Van Nostrand was brought into close association with a group of young army officers who became his friends and later his authors and editorial consultants. Numbered among them were William T. Sherman, H. W. Halleck, Silas Casey, Philip St. George Cooke, Quincy Gillmore, Hugh L. Scott, George W. Cullum, Philip Sheridan and many others known to history.

Barnard was an original member of the Aztec Club of 1847 as well as the Military Order of the Loyal Legion of the United States.

Barnard was a co-founder of the United States National Academy of Sciences, as were several other senior officers of the U.S. Army Corps of Engineers.

General Barnard retired from the Army on January 2, 1881 and died in Detroit, Michigan, on May 14, 1882. He is interred in Sheffield, Massachusetts.

== Writings ==
Barnard authored several scientific and engineering treatises and Civil War history papers. Among the more notable of these were:

- Phenomena of the Gyroscope analytically examined. 1858.
- Dangers and Defences of New York City. 1859.
- Notes on Seacoast Defence. 1861.
- The C. S. A. and the Battle of Bull Run. 1862.
- Reports of the Engineer and Artillery Operations of the Army of the Potomac from its Organization to the Close of the Peninsular Campaign. (Jointly with General Barry.) 1863.
- Eulogy on the late Major-General Joseph G. Totten, late Chief Engineer, IT. S. A. 1866.
- Report on the Defences of Washington. (P. P. Corps of Engrs., No. 20.) 1871.
- Fabrication of Iron for Defensive Purposes. (Jointly with General Wright and Colonel Michie.) (P. P. Corps of Engrs., No. 21, and supplement.) 1871.
- Report on the North Sea Canal of Holland. (P. P. Corps of Engrs., No. 22.) 1872.
- Problems of Rotary Motion presented by the Gyroscope, the Precession of the Equinoxes, and the Pendulum. Smithsonian Contributions to Knowledge, vol. XIX, 56 pages, 1872.
- On the Internal Structure of the Earth considered as Affecting the Phenomena of Precession and Nutation, being the Third of the Problems of Rotary Motion. Smithsonian Contributions to Knowledge, vol. XXIII, 19 pages, 1877.
- Over 90 articles in Johnson's Cyclopaedia on scientific subjects. 1874–1877.

== See also ==
- List of American Civil War generals (Union)
- List of Massachusetts generals in the American Civil War
- Massachusetts in the American Civil War

Military offices
Preceded by Robert E. Lee	Superintendents of the United States Military Academy; 1855–1856	Succeeded by Richard Delafield
