= 7th Street (Washington, D.C.) =

Street in Washington, D.C., United States

7th Street Southwest and Northwest
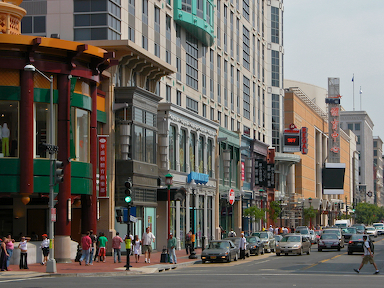
- 7th Street NW at H Street in Washington, D.C.
- Interactive map of 7th Street Southwest and Northwest
- Maintained by: DDOT
- Length: 2.6 mi (4.2 km) (main segment)
- Location: Southwest and Northwest, Washington, D.C.
- South end: Maine Avenue in Southwest Waterfront
- Major junctions: I-395 in Southwest Federal Center; Independence Avenue in Southwest Federal Center; US 1 / US 50 (Constitution Avenue) in Penn Quarter; Massachusetts Avenue in Mount Vernon Square; US 29 (Rhode Island Avenue) in Shaw
- North: Georgia Avenue
- East: 6th Street
- West: 8th Street

Construction
- Commissioned: 1791

There are two north–south arteries in Washington, D.C. named 7th Street that are differentiated by the quadrants of the city in which they are located.

== History ==
Historically, 7th Street was a main north–south road in Washington, D.C., and the main route for travelers and farmers coming into the city from the north. This is evident in its intersection with Mount Vernon Square, a historically important public space, and the original Central Market, located at the intersection of Seventh, Pennsylvania, and Indiana Avenues. The space occupied by this Central Market is now the Navy Memorial. The corridor from here west along F Street and north along Seventh is the city's historic retail shopping district with its large department stores and specialty stores. Seventh Street forms major intersections at Pennsylvania Avenue, E Street NW, H Street NW, K Street NW, and Massachusetts Avenue.

== 7th Street SW and NW ==
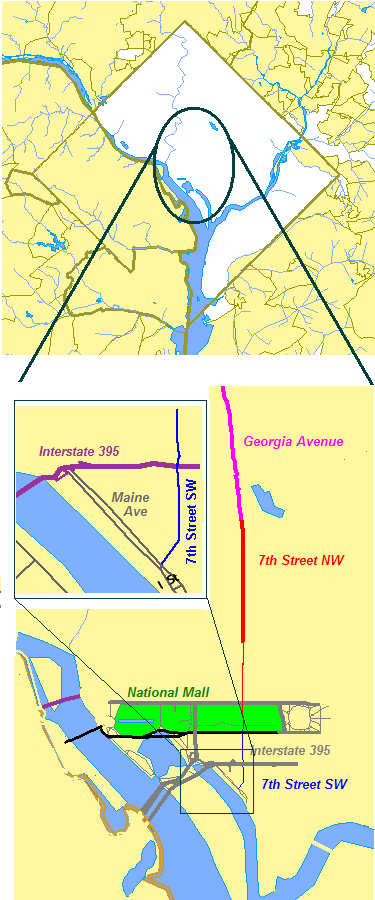
Map of Washington, D.C. showing 7th Street NW and SW and its connection to Georgia Avenue

7th Street SW begins at Water Street, near the banks of the Washington Channel. It crosses above Interstate 395 approximately two blocks before it intersects with Maryland and Virginia avenues near the U.S. Department of Transportation and the U.S. Department of Housing and Urban Development buildings, which are located across the street from each other on 7th Street SW.

Continuing north, 7th Street crosses the National Mall, where it becomes 7th Street NW. In this southernmost segment of 7th Street NW, it is the main north–south thoroughfare in Penn Quarter and Chinatown.

Farther north, it crosses New York Avenue at Mount Vernon Square and then crosses Rhode Island Avenue where it also becomes U.S. Route 29. North of Florida Avenue, 7th Street remains U.S. 29 but becomes a diagonal and continues as Georgia Avenue.

Between Pennsylvania Avenue and Mount Vernon Square, 7th Street has a northbound bus/bicycle lane. The corresponding southbound lane is on 9th Street.

7th Street begins again at Quincy Street NW extending north about 3 miles (4.8 km) to near the Maryland border, passing through Sherman Circle.

North of Independence Avenue, 7th Street/Georgia Avenue is part of the National Highway System.

== 7th Street SE and NE ==
A second set of 7th Streets lie in the eastern quadrants of the city, parallel to the western ones, in several discontinuous segments. The longest section begins at M Street SE, just north of the Washington Navy Yard. It continues north through the neighborhood of Capitol Hill. When 7th Street SE crosses East Capitol Street it becomes 7th Street NE and continues due north, ending at Florida Avenue, just south of Gallaudet University. Shorter segments of the 7th Street SE exist south of the Anacostia River, while parts of 7th Street NE are further north in the Brookland neighborhood.
