= Maine Avenue =

Street in Washington, D.C.

- Maine Avenue SW
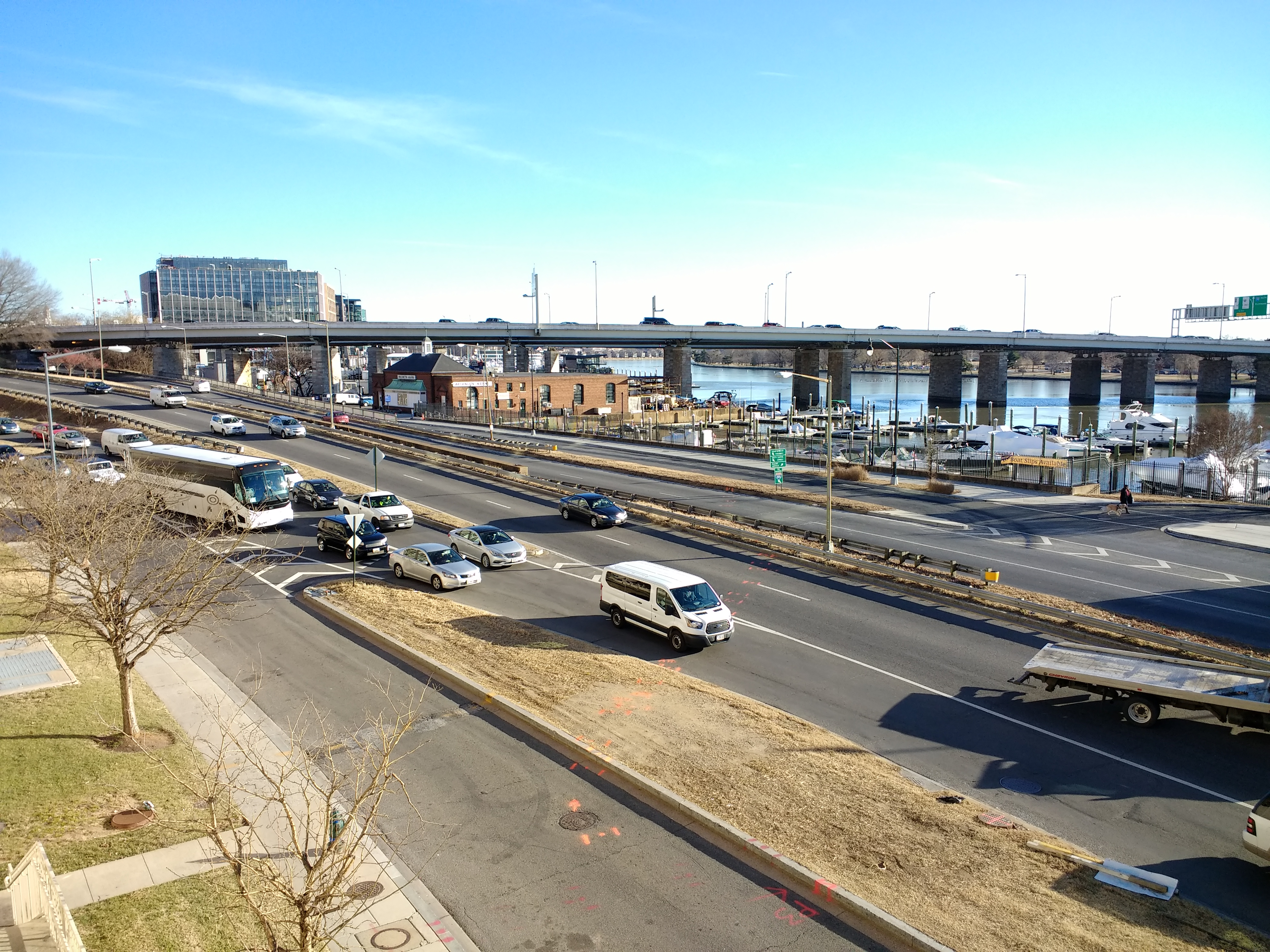
- Interactive map of Maine Avenue
- Maintained by: DDOT
- Location: Washington, D.C., U.S.
- Coordinates: 38°52′58.6″N 77°1′51.3″W
- West end: Independence Avenue
- Major junctions: US 1 (14th Street) / Ohio Drive; I-395 / 12th Street; 7th Street
- East end: 6th / M Streets

Maine Avenue is a diagonal avenue in the Southwest quadrant of Washington, D.C. Maine Avenue connects Independence Avenue with M Street SW, and has an interchange with Interstate 395.

== Route description ==
Maine Avenue begins at 17th Street SW and Independence Avenue SW and continues southeast, parallelling the Tidal Basin to 12th Street SW where it crosses under Interstate 395. Continuing southeast, it runs parallel to the Washington Channel and Water Street SW, where it crosses 7th Street. At 6th Street SW, Maine Avenue ends, becoming M Street SW.

== Points of interest ==
Points of interest along Maine Avenue include Arena Stage and the Southwest Waterfront, home of the Maine Avenue Fish Market.

== History ==
In 1861, Maine Avenue was a small street north and parallel to Maryland Avenue near Capitol Hill.

Interstate 695 was planned to be extended west of Interstate 395 along Maine Avenue. That project, like many proposed interstate highways in the District of Columbia, was canceled.

== See also ==
- DC Waterfront, Maine Avenue - a painting of Maine Avenue by Delilah Pierce
