= Francis Case Memorial Bridge =

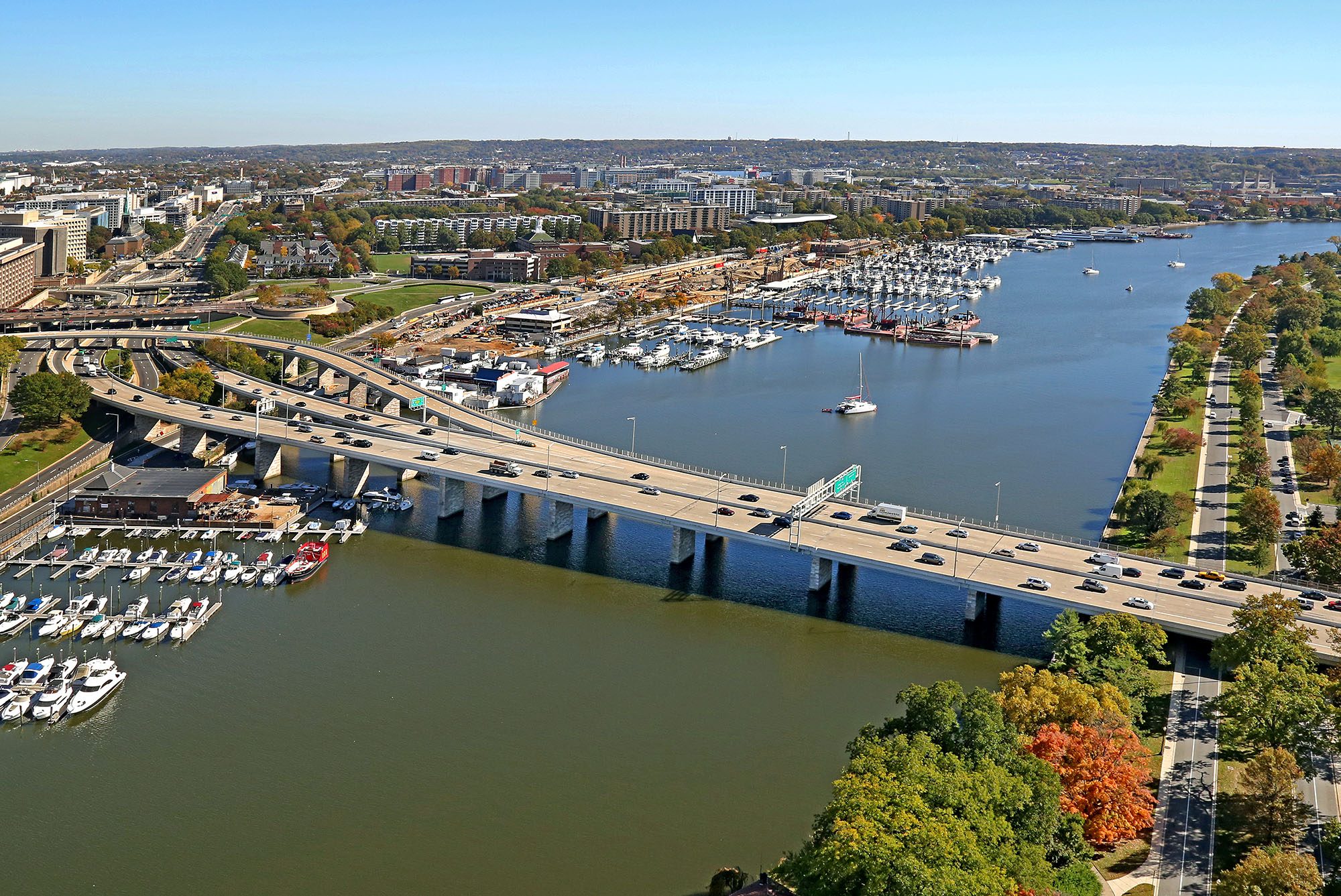
- Aerial view of the bridge in 2014
- Coordinates: 38.88056°N 77.03098°W
- Carries: Motor vehicles, pedestrians, cyclists
- Crosses: Washington Channel
- Locale: Washington, D.C., U.S.
- Named for: Francis Case
- Owner: District Department of Transportation
- Preceded by: Charles R. Fenwick Bridge

Characteristics
- Design: Beam bridge
- Total length: 1,578.2 feet (481.0 m)
- Width: 99.4 feet (30.3 m)
- No. of lanes: 8

History
- Construction cost: $8 million
- Opened: 1962
- Rebuilt: 1993-1995

Statistics
- Daily traffic: 150,600
- Toll: Free both ways

Location
- Interactive map of Francis Case Memorial Bridge

The Francis Case Memorial Bridge is a steel beam bridge carrying Interstate 395 (I-395) over the Washington Channel in Washington, D.C. It is an eight-lane bridge with a bicycle/pedestrian lane on the inbound side. It has two spans that split into three on the north side of the channel. The bridge is sometimes but not always considered to be part of the 14th Street Bridges, as it crosses the Washington Channel rather than the main channel of the Potomac River.

== History ==
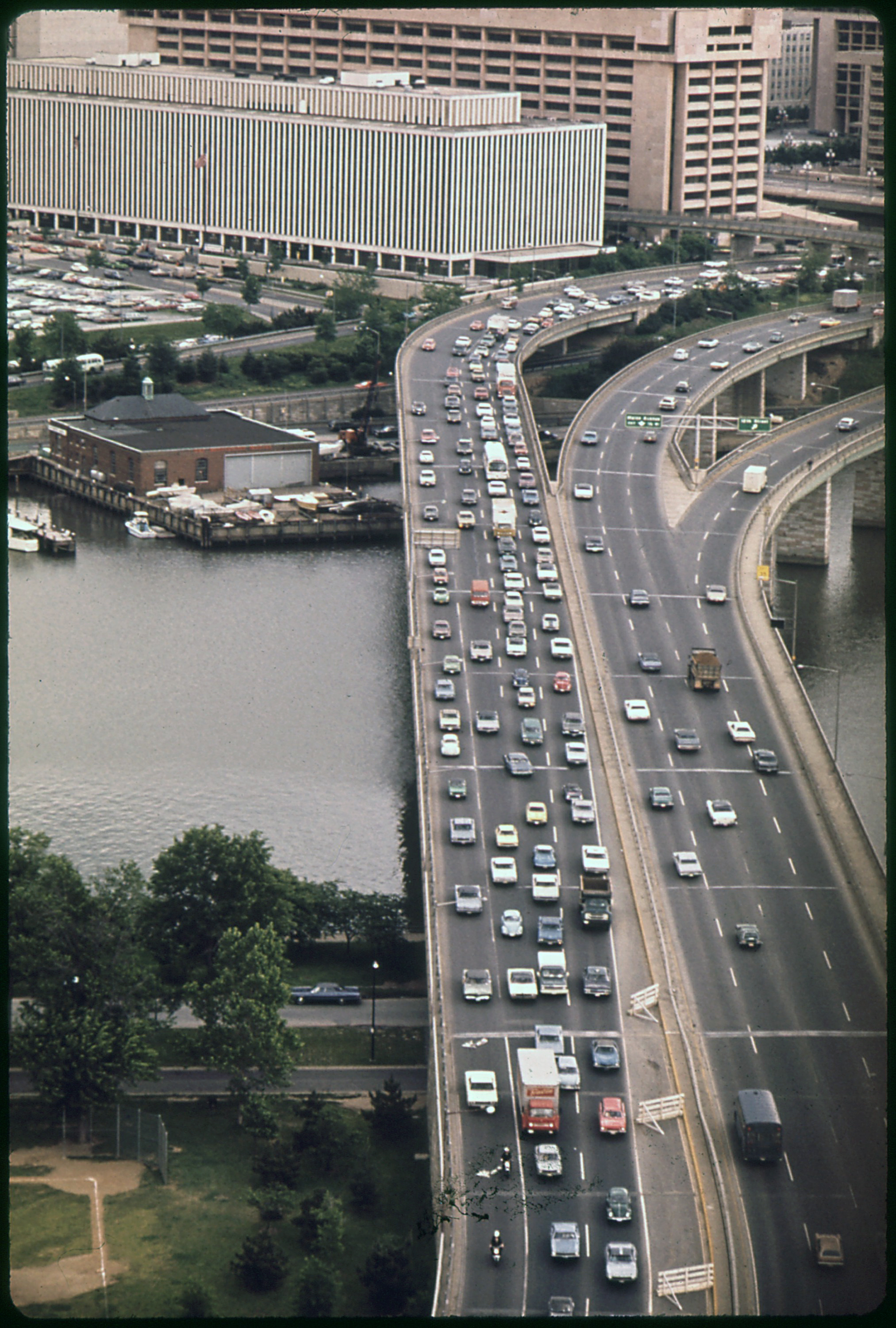
Aerial view of the bridge deck in 1973

Though a Washington Channel Bridge had been proposed as far back as 1931, planning for the bridge that was built wasn't started until 1952 and all of the bridge's elements weren't completed until the 1970s. In the early 1950s planners recognized the need to connect the planned Southwest Freeway in DC with Shirley Highway in Arlington to serve as part of the inner loop. This would require new bridges across the Potomac and the Washington Channel. The original 1952 proposal was to build a bridge in a straight line from 10th an F to Roaches Run. It required closing multiple blocks of Virginia Avenue to build a half circle south of Independence Avenue - thus creating a new Smithsonian site, rebuilding 10th Street and removing numerous structures. By 1955, a proposal from NCPC shifted the Potomac Bridge north to 14th Street, necessitating an S-curve across the Channel Bridge and the highway on East Potomac Island. Despite opposition from the National Park Service to running the highway so close to the Lincoln Memorial, this is the design that was eventually approved. After additional planning and approvals, Federal and District officials broke ground for the $8 million Washington Channel Bridge on August 20, 1959, though work on the piers had started earlier that summer. During construction they moved the historic Maine Avenue fish market to make room for the bridge. The bridge, along with the 12th Street Expressway, opened on July 31, 1962. When South Dakota Senator Francis H. Case died a little more than a month before the bridge opened, a bill was introduced to rename the bridge for him in honor of his role as an architect of the 23rd Amendment which granted DC residents the right to vote for Electoral College electors, and for his years of service on the Senate Committee on the District of Columbia. The bill passed in 1965 and the bridge was renamed.

The pedestrian/bike ramp to the bridge was originally just an elevated switchback that ended on a grassy area between the sidewalks of Maine Ave and the Southwest Freeway. In 1971, Banneker Circle was altered and a causeway was designed to run between the circle and the Case Bridge switchback. At the time of the 1971 work, the causeway was contracted but it wasn't completed until sometime between 1973 and 1979. The work included removing a section of the northwest wall to create an access for the causeway. The elevated paved causeway has mortared granite cladding in an ashlar pattern and is built up as high as 15 feet where it connects to the switchback ramp. Where this causeway ramp rises from grade, it is lined with a five foot tall galvanized railing on either side. In 2018, in order to connect L'Enfant Plaza to the new Wharf Development across Maine Avenue, the causeway was redesigned again. Where the causeway is at grade, a landing was added which connects to a wide staircase down to Maine Avenue; more of the northwest wall was removed to create a better connection and a curb ramp was added down to the circle.

The bridge was rehabilitated from October 4, 1993, to September 20, 1994. The work replaced the bridge decking.

== Gallery ==
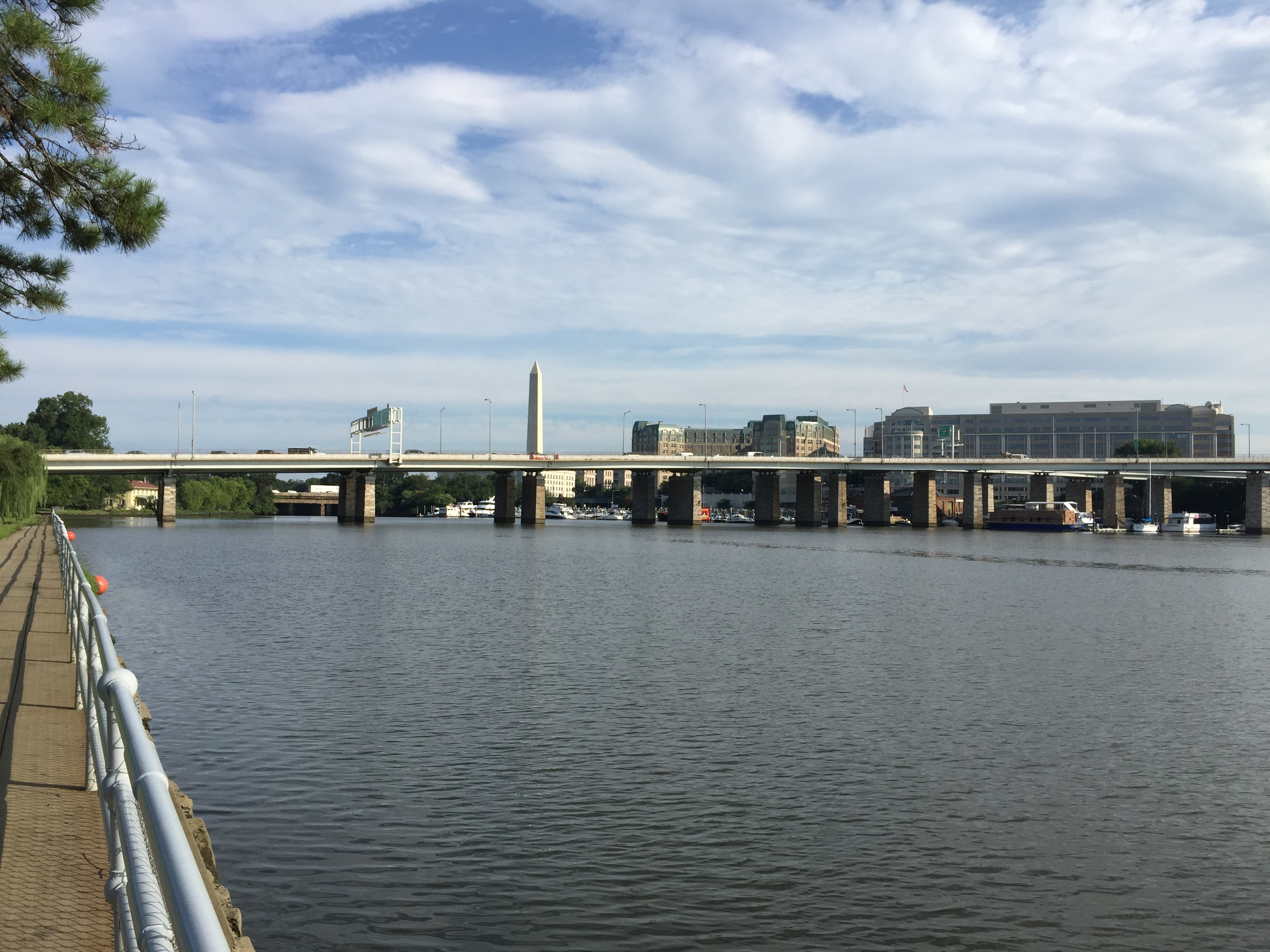
The bridge in 2015

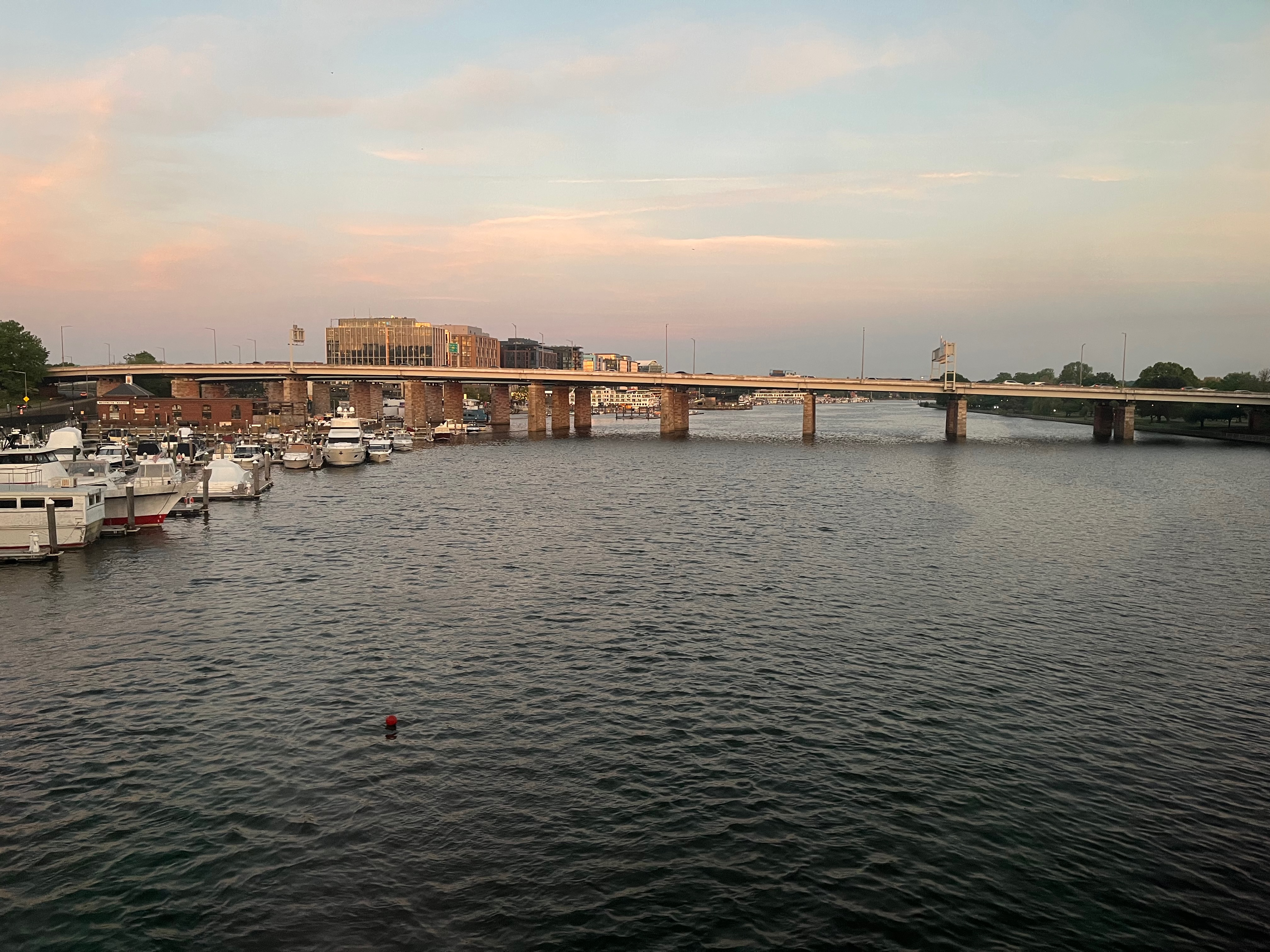
The bridge viewed from an Amtrak Cardinal train in 2025

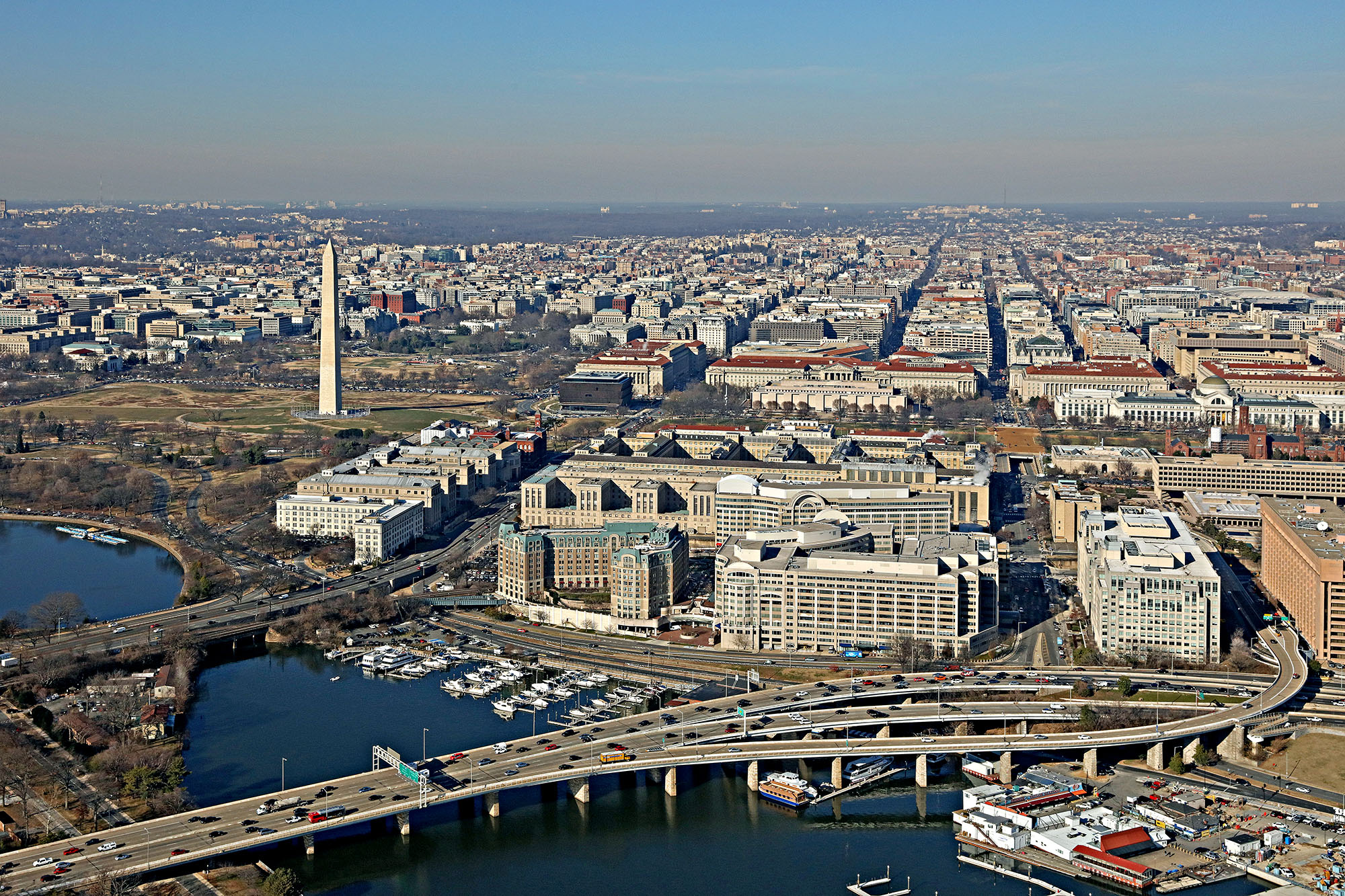
Looking northwest towards Washington, DC

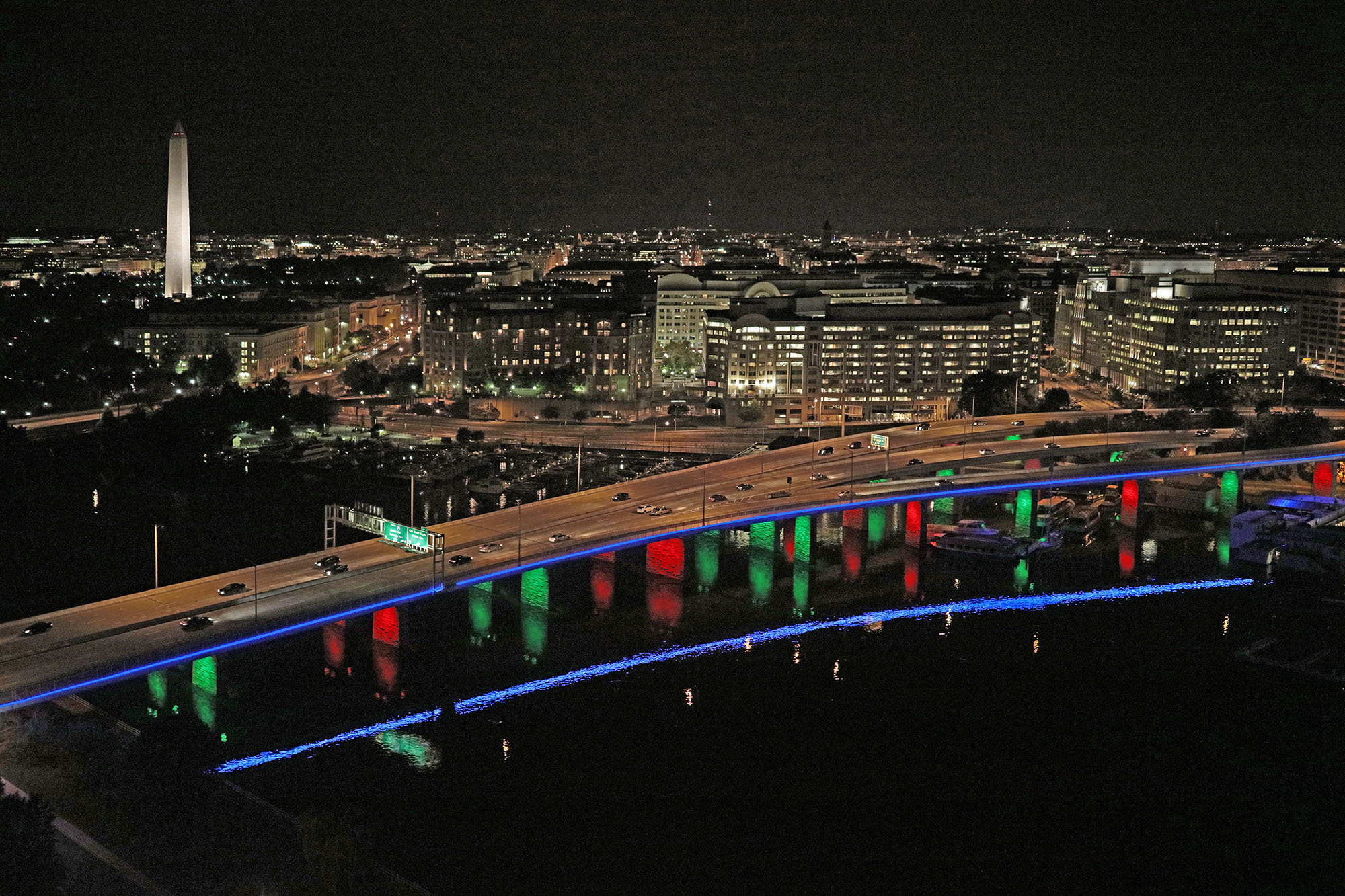
Lighting during the holidays at night

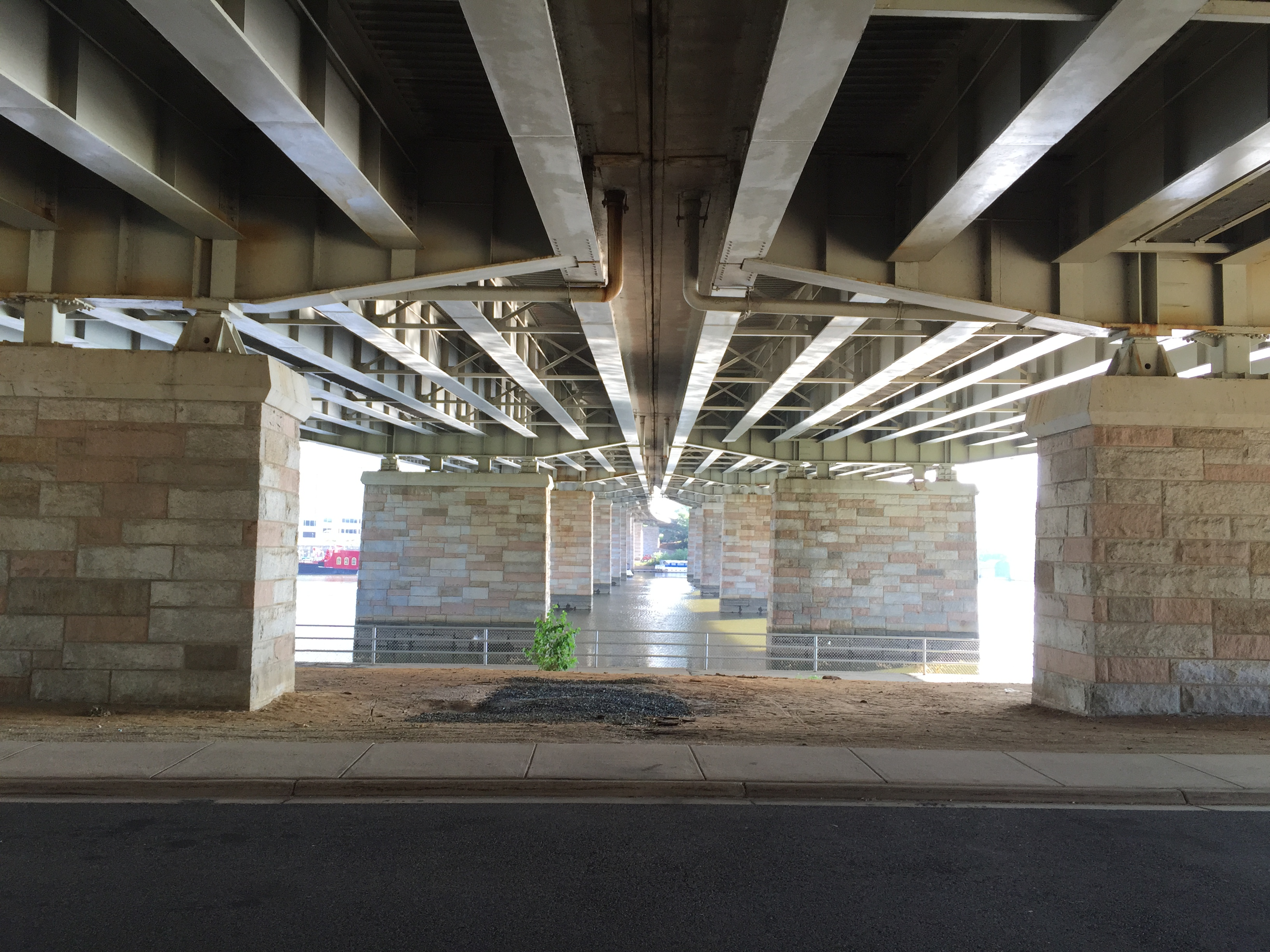
Underside from the south in 2015

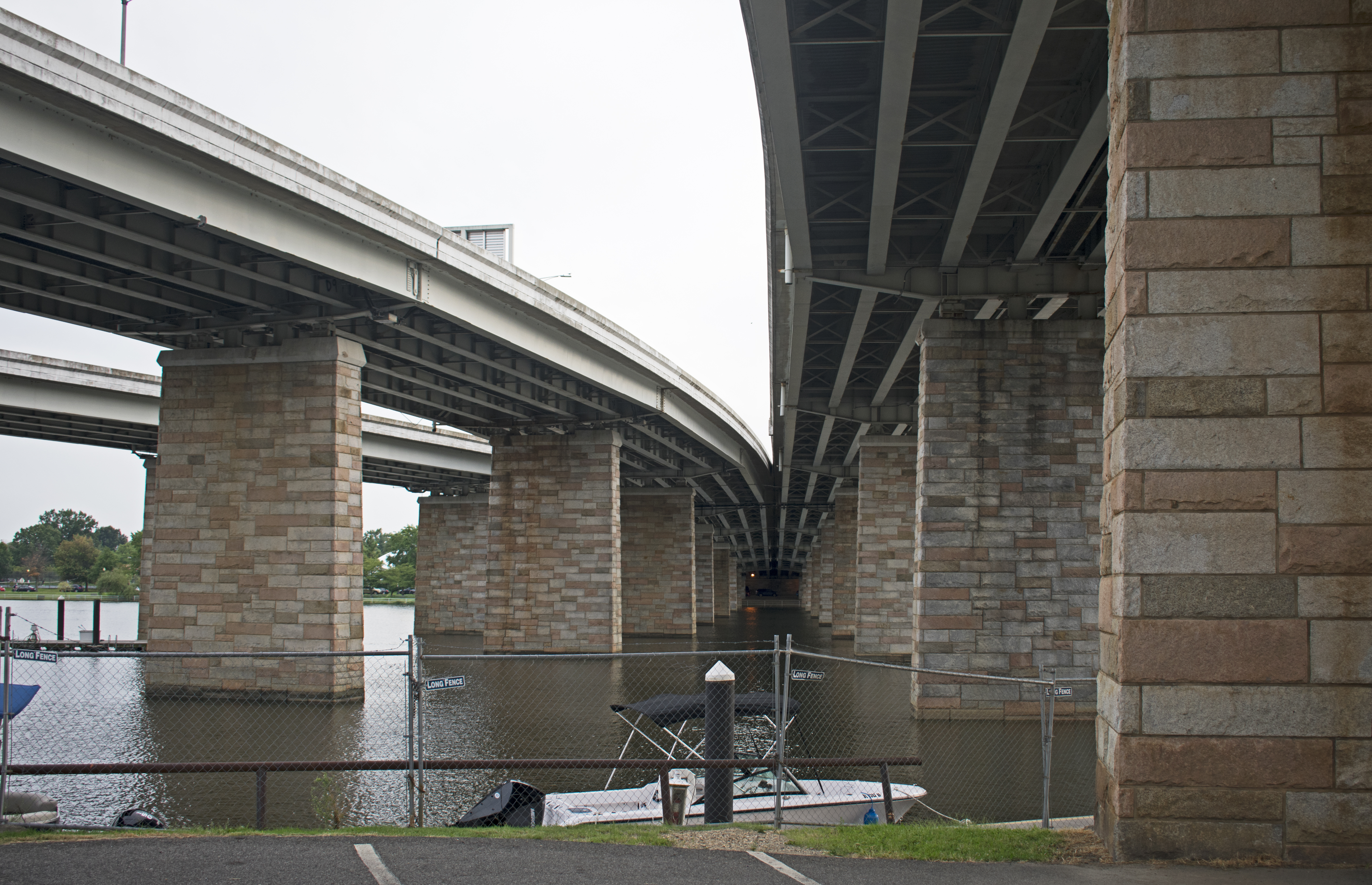
Underside from the north in 2023
