= Interstate 395 (Virginia–District of Columbia) =

Interstate Highway in the DC area

Interstate 395
- I-395 highlighted in red

Route information
- Auxiliary route of I-95
- Maintained by VDOT and DDOT
- Length: 13.79 mi (22.19 km)
- Existed: 1977–present
- NHS: Entire route
- Restrictions: No hazardous goods or vehicles over 13 ft (4.0 m) in 3rd Street Tunnel

Major junctions
- South end: I-95 / I-495 in Springfield, VA
- US 1 in Arlington, VA; George Washington Parkway in Arlington, VA; US 1 in Washington, DC; I-695 in Washington, DC
- North end: US 50 (New York Ave) in Washington, DC

Location
- Country: United States
- States: Virginia, District of Columbia
- Counties: VA: Fairfax, City of Alexandria, Arlington; DC: City of Washington

Highway system
- Interstate Highway System; Main; Auxiliary; Suffixed; Business; Future
- Virginia Routes; Interstate; US; Primary; Secondary; Byways; History; HOT lanes
- Streets and Highways of Washington, DC; Interstate; US; DC; State-Named Streets
| ← SR 394 | VA | → SR 396 |
| ← DC 295 | DC | → I-495 |

Interstate 395 (I-395) in Virginia and Washington, D.C., is a 13.79-mile-long (22.19 km) spur route of I-95 that begins at an interchange with I-95 in Springfield and ends at an interchange with US Route 50 (US 50) in Northwest Washington, D.C. It passes underneath the National Mall near the US Capitol and ends at a junction with US 50 at New York Avenue, roughly one mile (1.6 km) north of the 3rd Street Tunnel.

I-395 is known by three names over its various segments. The Virginia portion is part of the larger Shirley Highway that continues southward on I-95 beyond the terminus of I-395. In the District of Columbia, it is known as the Southwest Freeway from the 14th Street bridges to the Southeast Freeway interchange (I-695) and the Center Leg or Center Leg Freeway from the Southeast Freeway interchange to New York Avenue.

It is unrelated and unconnected to I-395 in Maryland.

== Route description ==
Lengths
| | mi | km |
|---|---|---|
| VA | 9.9 | 15.9 |
| DC | 3.8 | 6.1 |
| Total | 13.7 | 22.0 |

=== Virginia ===
I-395, I-95, and the Capital Beltway (I-495) meet in the Springfield Interchange, a complex intersection often referred to as the "Mixing Bowl"—even though that name was historically applied to the intersection of I-395, Washington Boulevard, and Columbia Pike (SR 244) several miles north, which continues to be recognized by the Virginia Department of Transportation as such.

I-395 contains a third roadway: reversible, barrier-separated Virginia high-occupancy toll (HOT) lanes with their own entrances and exits, also known locally as the "express lanes", between South Eads Street near The Pentagon in Arlington and Route 17 in Fredericksburg. During morning and evening rush hour, traffic on this roadway flows in the direction of rush-hour traffic.

This third roadway was built as a single-lane busway, the first in the U.S., before being expanded and converted to high-occupancy vehicle HOV use. A 2007 survey found that during the morning rush hour, the HOV lanes carry about 65 percent of travelers on I-395 (61,000 commuters), including 32,000 in transit busses and 29,000 in private vehicles with two or more people. The other 33,000 commuters (35 percent of total users) drove alone.

I-395 and Route 1 cross the Potomac River from Virginia to Washington, D.C. on three parallel four-lane bridges, together known as the 14th Street bridges. The Potomac River crossings for the Washington Metro's Yellow Line and for a major CSX Transportation railroad line are immediately downstream here. This site has long been a major Potomac River crossing, with the first bridge constructed here in 1809. Of the present highway spans, the eastern one was built in 1950, the western one in 1962, and the central one in 1972.

=== Washington, D.C. ===
After crossing the 14th Street Bridges, the freeway has a left-side exit allowing access to Route 1 (exit 1). The southbound side of I-395 has no access to northbound US 1 here. I-395 crosses East Potomac Park (exit 2) and a second bridge, the Francis Case Memorial Bridge over the Washington Channel. Here, the route bends from a generally northeast direction to a due east direction, interchanging (exit 3) with the 12th Street Expressway, two tunnels that carry traffic under the National Mall. A series of complex interchanges (numbered 4, 5, 6, and 7) provide partial access to Maine Avenue and C Street SW, as well as connections to I-695. Immediately after I-695, the freeway makes a hard turn to the due north to follow the 3rd Street Tunnel immediately under the Hubert H. Humphrey Building and Union Square, just to the west of the US Capitol building and underneath its reflecting pool and the Frances Perkins Building. I-395 follows a depressed roadway (the Center Leg Freeway), which was placed underground in 2019, that has three more partial interchanges (exits 8, 9, and 10) with local streets before terminating at the intersection of New York Avenue (Route 50).

Images from I-395, from south to north

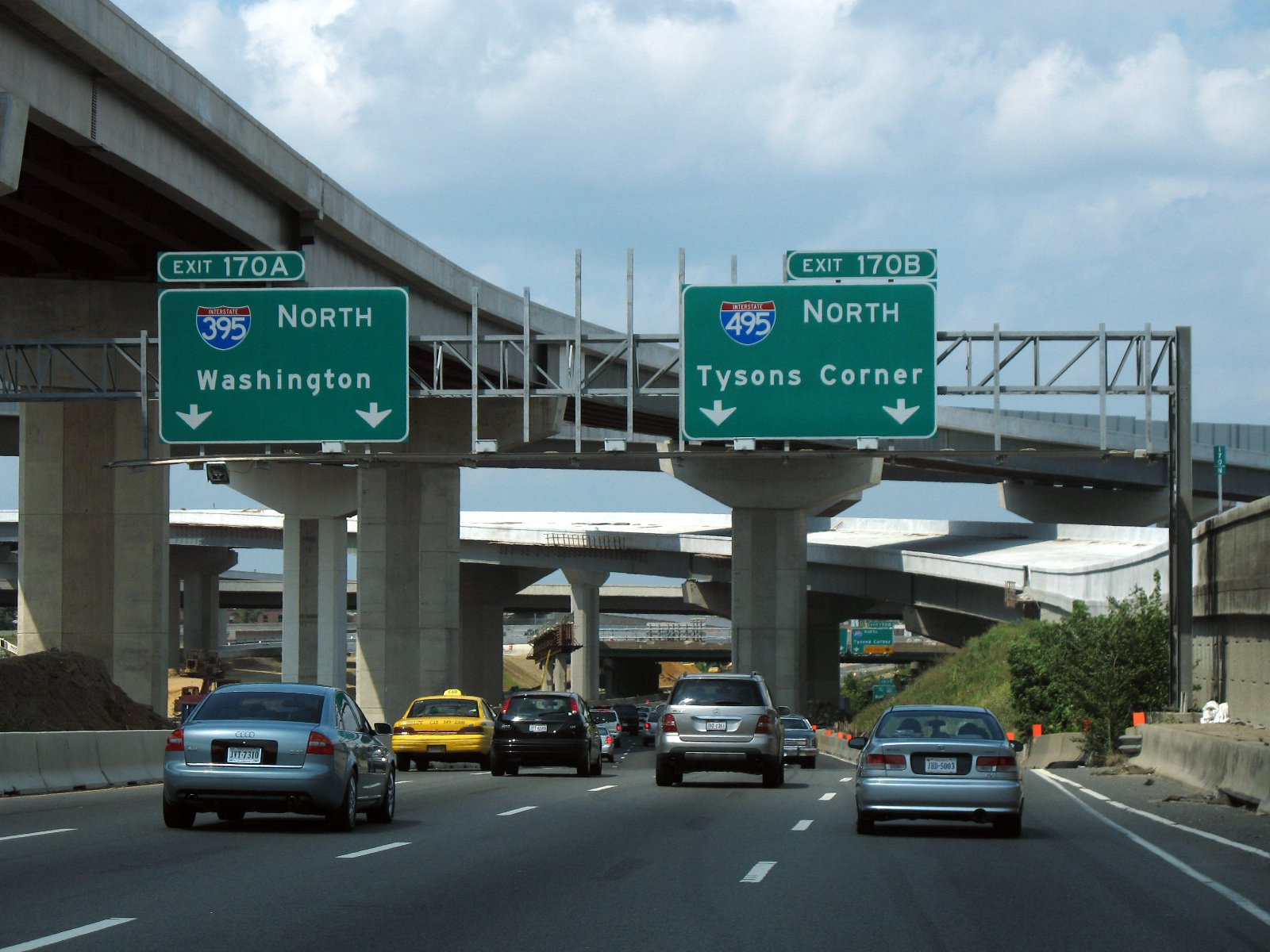
Southern terminus of I-395 at the Springfield Interchange

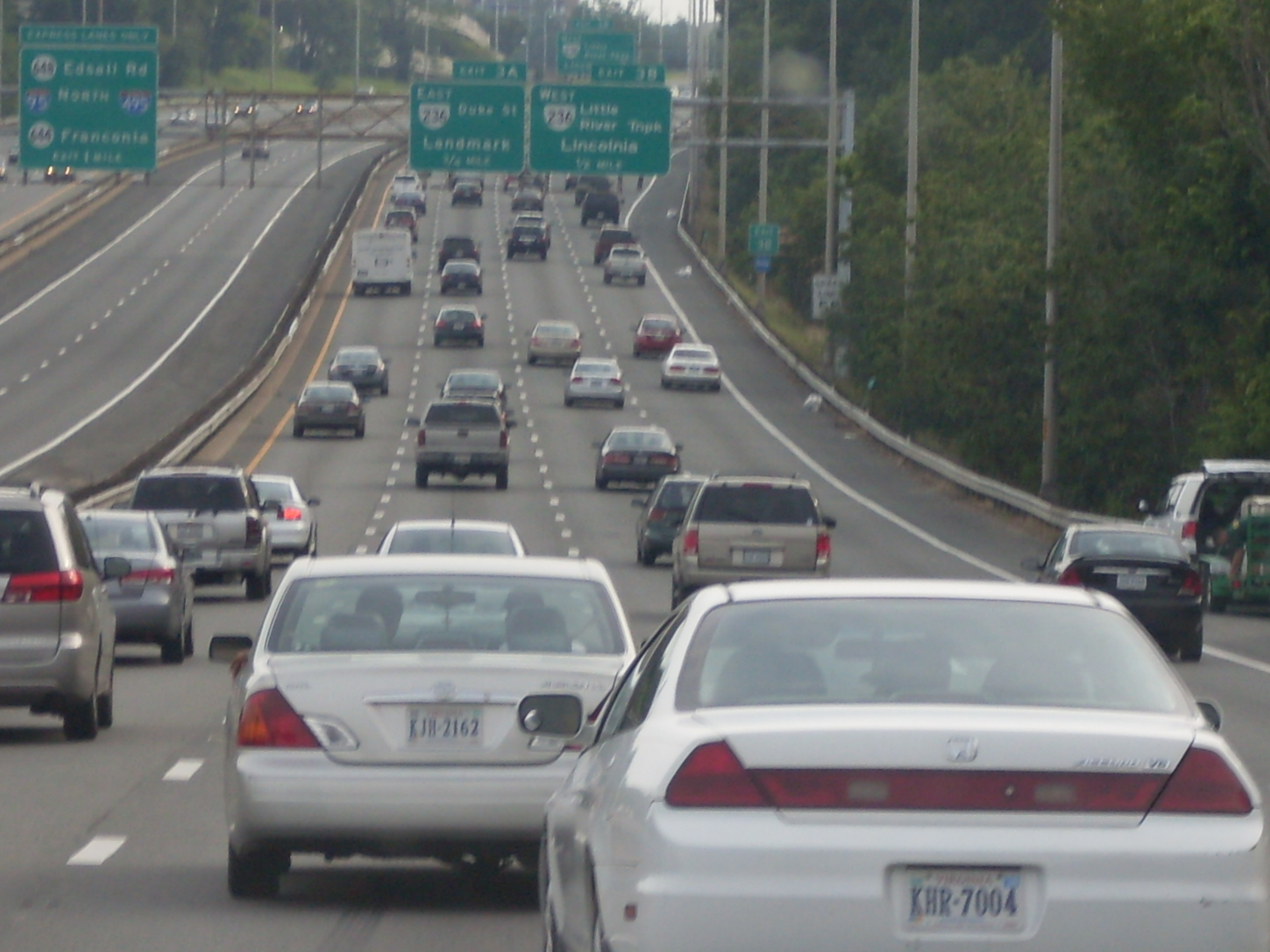
I-395 in Alexandria

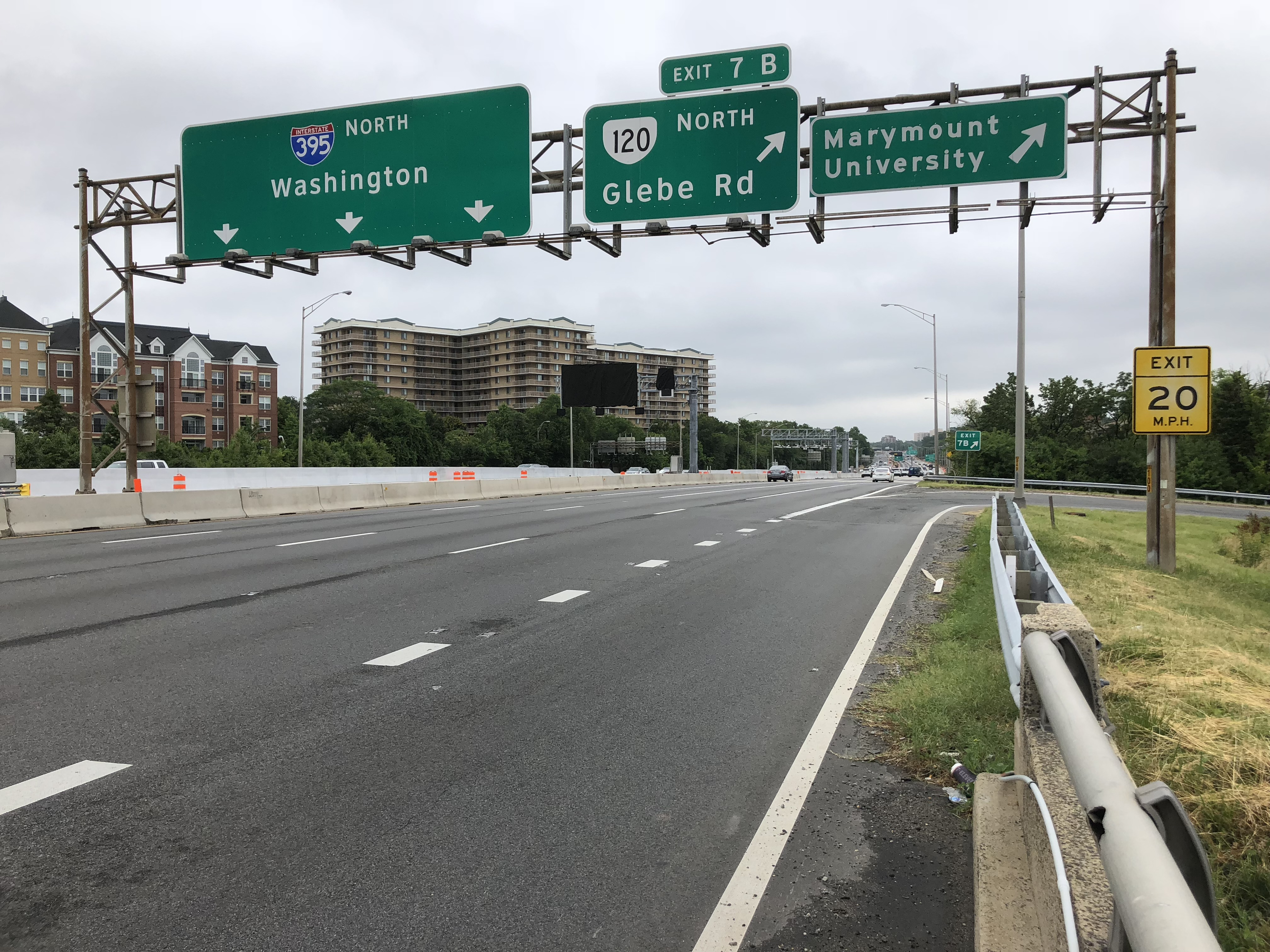
I-395 northbound at Glebe Road in Arlington

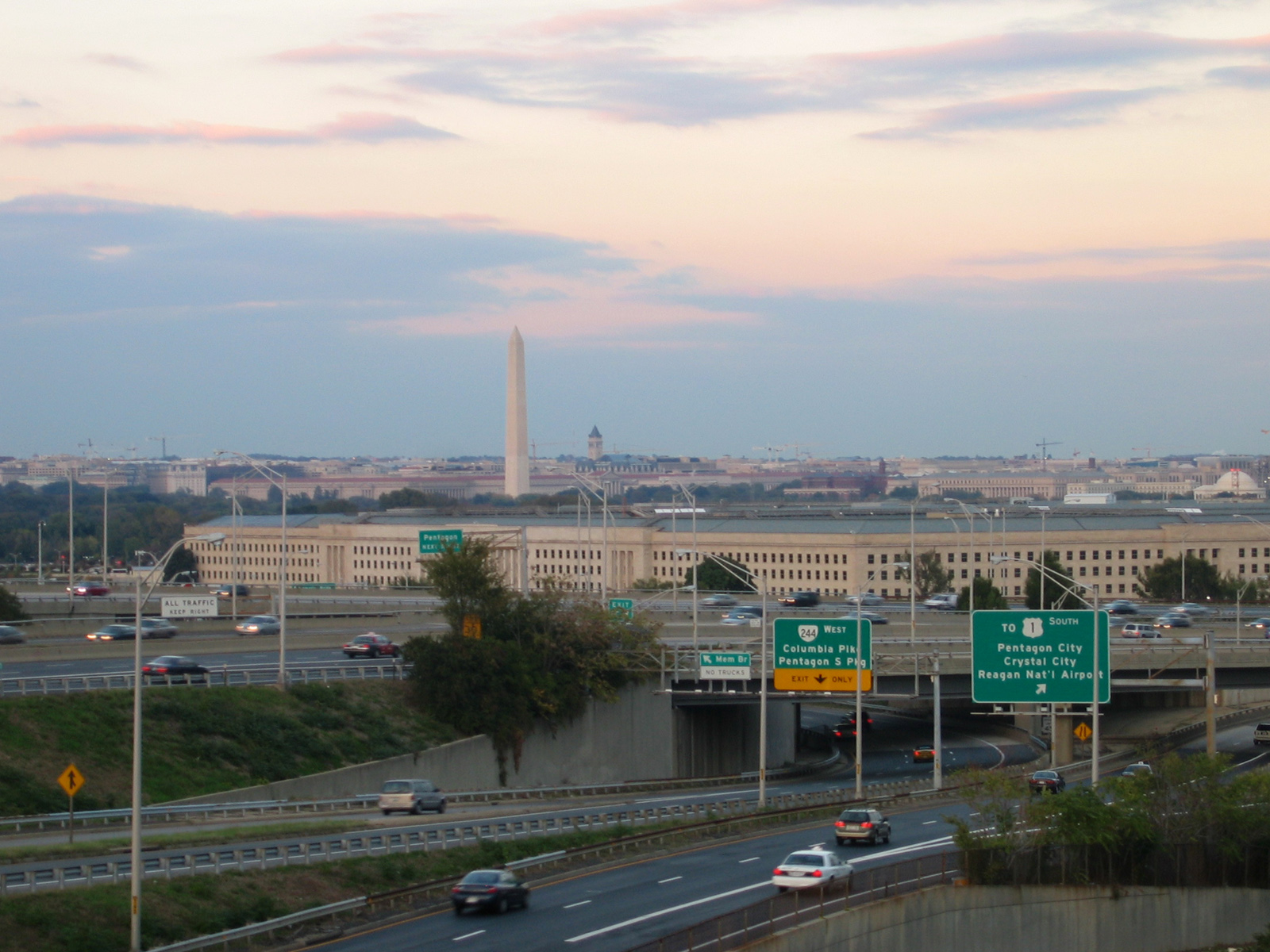
Cars on I-395, leaving Washington, D.C. (in distance) and passing by The Pentagon in Arlington

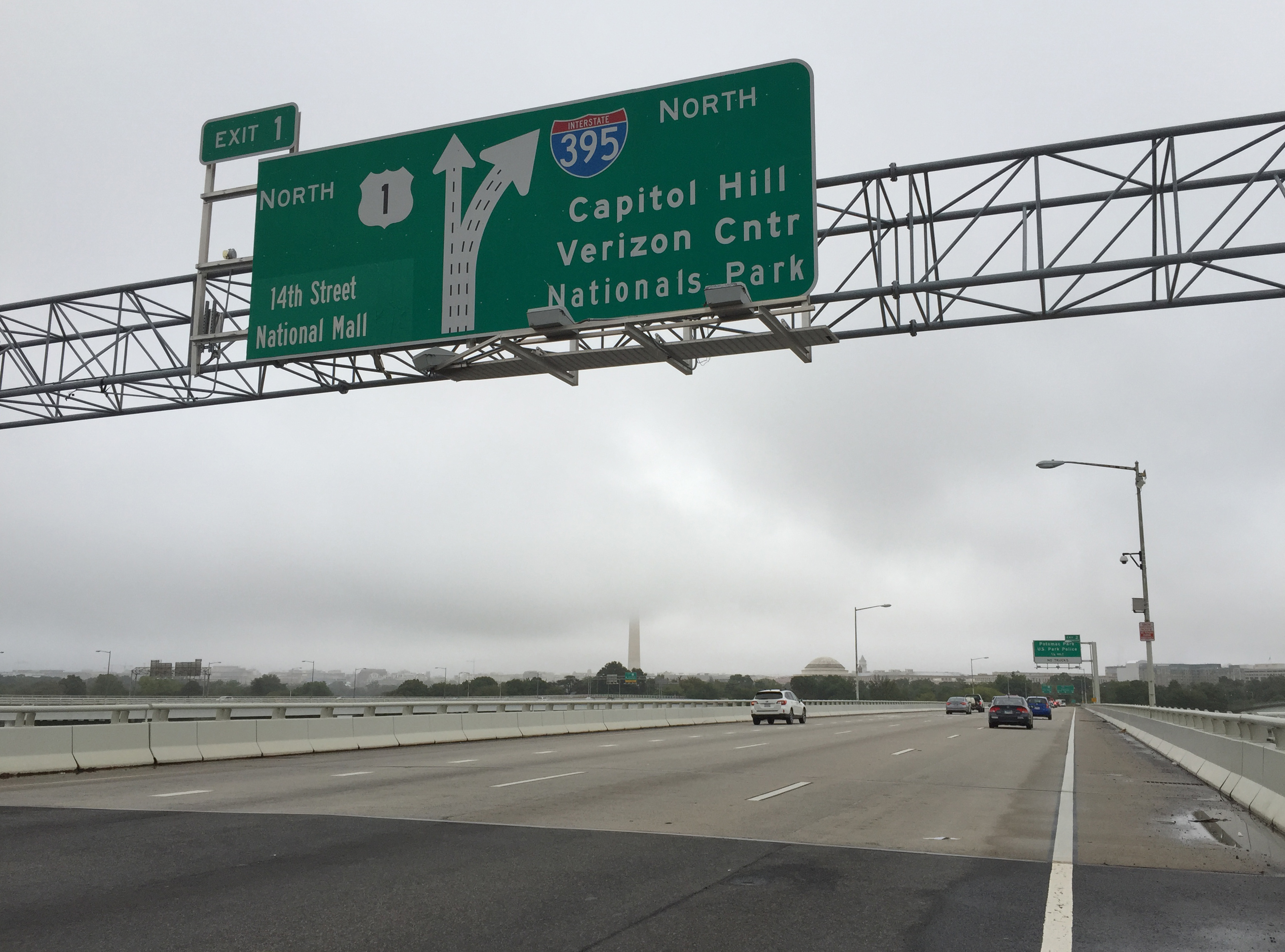
US 1 exit on I-395 northbound, just after crossing the 14th Street bridges into the District of Columbia

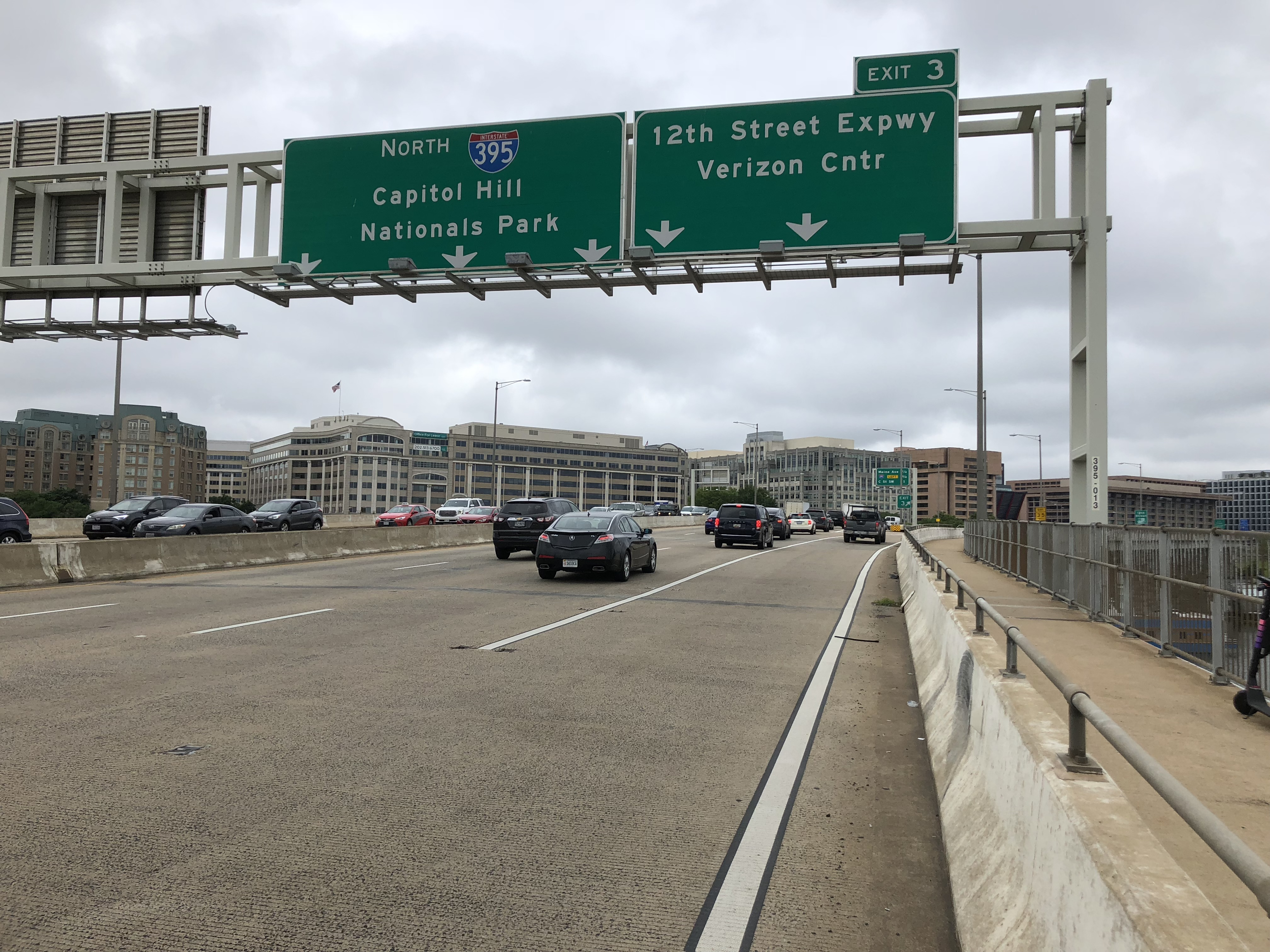
Interstate 395 northbound along the Southwest Freeway at exit 3

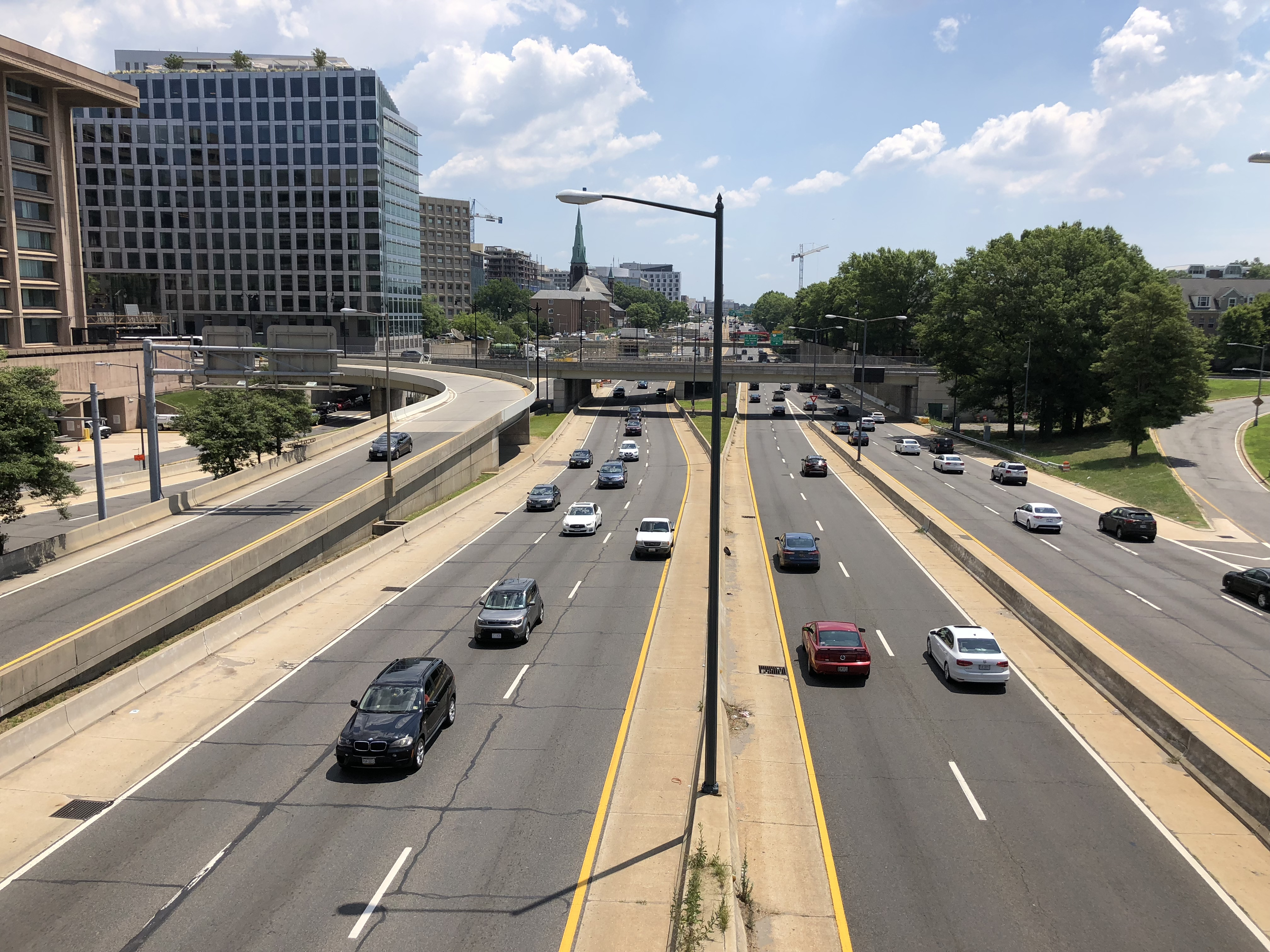
The Southwest Freeway northbound at L'Enfant Plaza

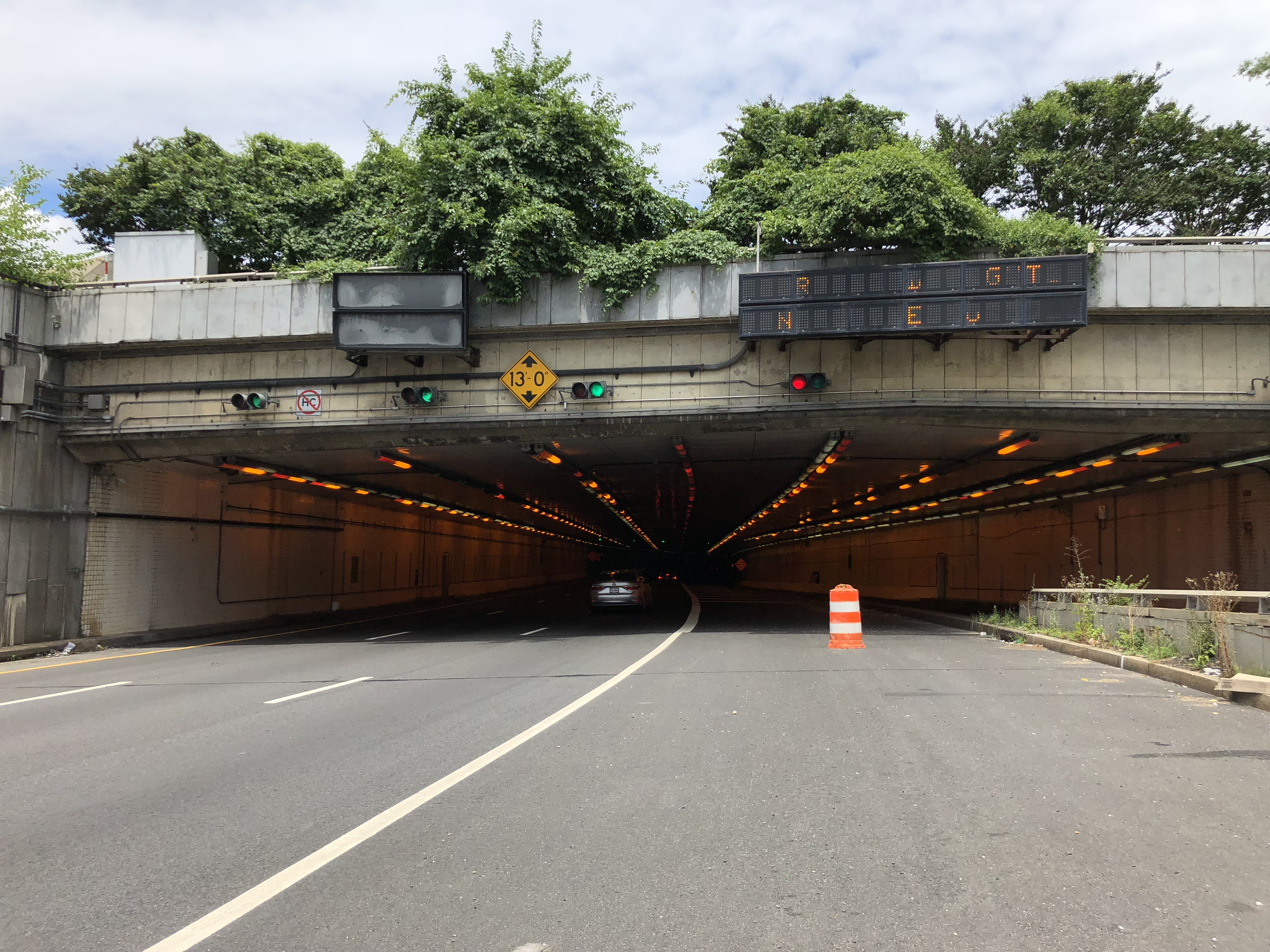
Entrance to the 3rd Street Tunnel under the National Mall

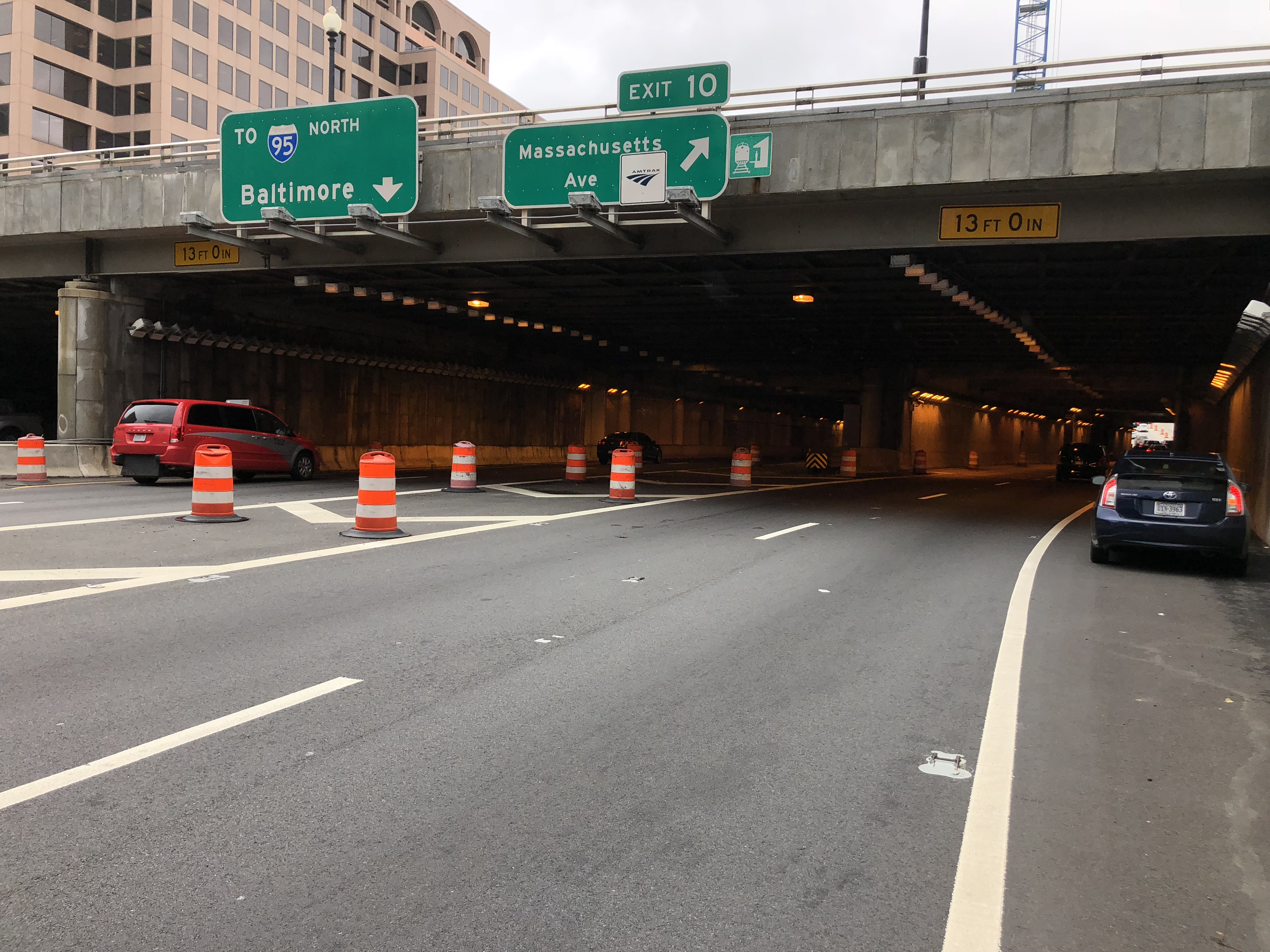
I-395 northbound along the Center Leg Freeway at exit 10

== History ==
=== Shirley Highway ===
The portion of I-395 between The Pentagon in Arlington, and the interchange with I-95 and the Capital Beltway in Springfield is part of the Henry G. Shirley Memorial Highway, named for the Virginia Highway Commissioner who died on July 16, 1941, just a few weeks after approving work on the new expressway. Originally SR 350, the full length of the Henry G. Shirley Memorial Highway was opened on September 6, 1949, from south of the Pentagon to Woodbridge, Virginia, along what is now better known as the I-95 corridor. The Henry G. Shirley Memorial Highway featured the nation's first reversible bus lanes, a precursor to today's HOV lanes.

During an evening rush-hour snowstorm in 1982, Air Florida Flight 90 crashed on takeoff from what was then known as Washington National Airport, hitting the easternmost of the three highway bridges known as the 14th Street bridges. The oldest span, formerly named the Rochambeau, is now named the Arland D. Williams Jr. Memorial Bridge, in honor of a passenger of Flight 90 who survived the crash, escaped from the sinking aircraft, and perished in the Potomac River while saving others from the icy waters. The center span is now called the Rochambeau Bridge and the western span the George Mason Memorial Bridge, after a US delegate to the Constitutional Convention.

=== Interstate Highway through Washington, D.C. ===
Original plans called for I-95 to travel through Washington, D.C. and Prince George’s County, toward the northeastern portion of the Capital Beltway (I-495), from which I-95 presently continues its northbound route. However, neighborhood opposition in D.C. halted this plan in 1977, diverting planned funding toward construction of the Washington Metro. The only remnant of the Maryland extension is a series of ramp stubs near College Park, which now lead to a park and ride. The portion of I-95 within the beltway became I-395, while the eastern half of the beltway was redesignated I-95 (and, later, cosigned I-95/I-495). I-395 terminates in Washington, D.C. at a traffic signal at Route 50, which is New York Avenue, near Mount Vernon Square.

=== Center Leg Freeway development/Capitol Crossing ===
The DC government finalized a deal in 2010 with Louis Dreyfus Company to construct a 2.1-million-square-foot (200,000 m^{2}) mixed-use development in the airspace over the Center Leg Freeway portion of I-395. The $425-million (equivalent to $595 million in 2024) office, residential, and retail project at the east end of the Judiciary Square neighborhood will also restore the area's original L'Enfant Plan street grid by reconnecting F and G streets over the freeway. The project was awaiting final regulatory approval and expected to be complete by 2016.

In 2015, work began on I-395 in conjunction with Capitol Crossing, a major real-estate project in DC, part of which lies on top of the highway. The work involves adding a $200-million (equivalent to $258 million in 2024) concrete platform that connects neighborhoods that have been severed by the freeway, creating a better community atmosphere in the eastern edge of downtown. The District Department of Transportation (DDOT) expected the work would take up to four years.

=== Express lanes conversion ===
In 2015, the commonwealth of Virginia announced that the HOV lanes between the Turkeycock Run Bridge and South Eads Street (at the Pentagon) would be converted to toll lanes as part of the I-395 Express Lanes Extension project. The existing HOV lanes, which ran in both directions in some areas, became reversible HOT lanes for the entire scope of this project, spanning eight miles (13 km).

Part of the project involved the reconfiguring of The Pentagon interchange to provide greater access to Army Navy Drive, as well as the closing of the onramp—from the southbound HOV lanes to the mainline Interstate southbound—located just west of the Pentagon interchange. All existing HOV interchanges within the project's scope became tolled.

Vehicles carrying three or more passengers are still able to use the former HOV lanes for free if they have E-ZPass Flex transponders in HOV mode. The express lanes opened on November 17, 2019. The lanes are operated by Transurban. The reversible portion runs toward the District of Columbia in the morning and toward Virginia in the afternoon.

=== Exits 9 and 10A—Boundary Channel Drive construction ===
In December 2023, the Virginia Department of Transportation permanently closed Exit 9 for Clark Street as part of construction on Boundary Channel Drive. As part of the project, the Virginia Department of Transportation converted Exit 10 to a dumbbell interchange to "improve traffic operations and safety." VDOT also built new pedestrian and bicycle paths to connect Crystal City to Long Bridge Park, the Mount Vernon Trail, and The Pentagon.

== Future ==
=== I-195 redesignation ===
Future Interstate 195
- Location: Washington, D.C.
- Length: 2.41 mi (3.88 km)

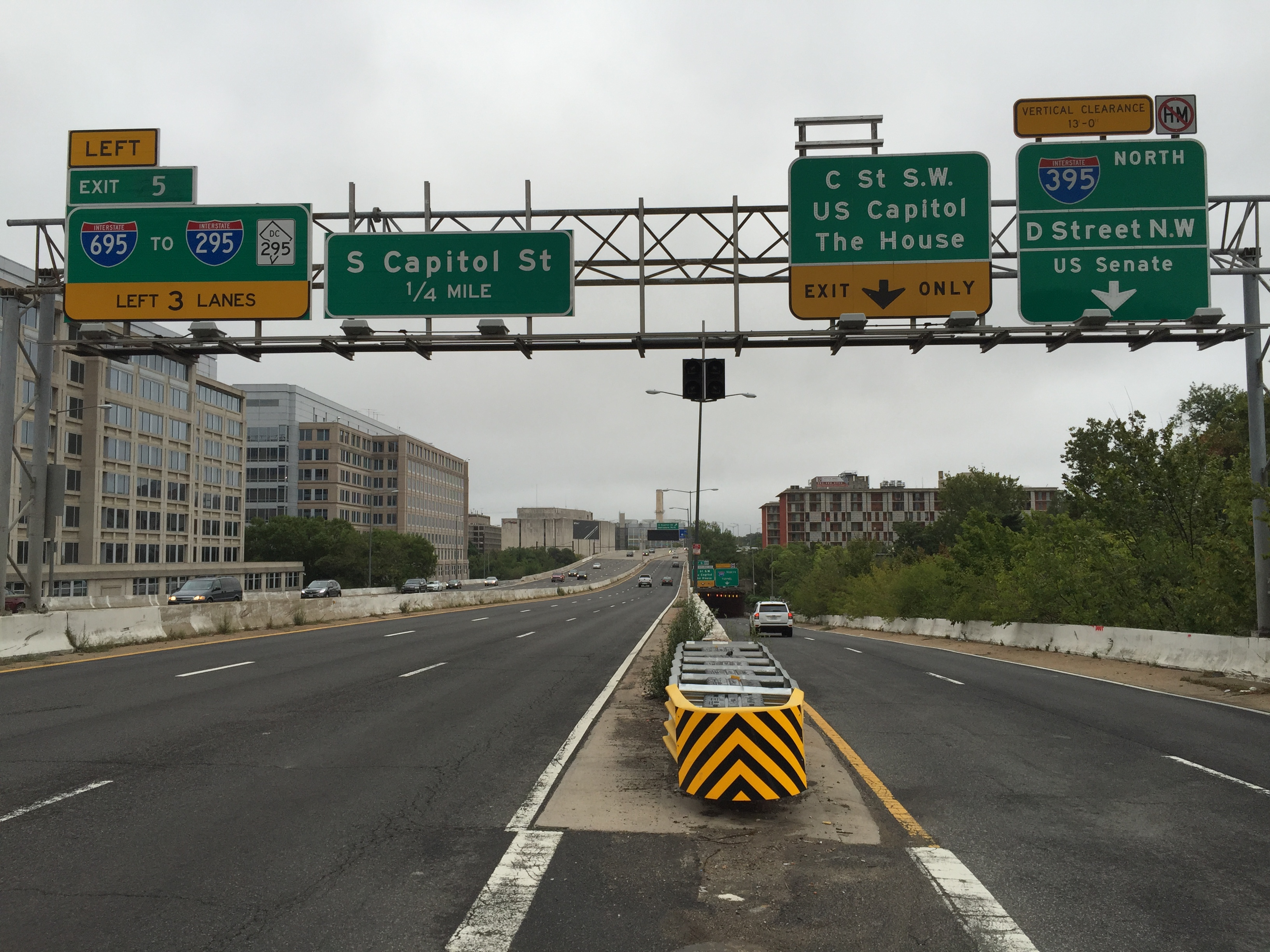
View east at I-395 Exit 5 (2016)

I-395's turn-off-to-stay-on movement into the 3rd Street Tunnel causes confusion among drivers who intend to continue straight on the Southeast Freeway, but do not realize that they need to follow the posted "Exit 5" for I-695 to do so. WTOP traffic reporters monitor the area with their own cameras, and note numerous incidents of dangerous weaving, as well as trucks—which may be over-height or prohibited from the tunnel—reversing up the exit ramp to continue on the Southeast Freeway. Additionally, I-395 uses sequential exit numbering while I-695 uses mileage-based numbers, resulting in both roads having exits numbered 1 and 2. In January 2021, the American Association of State Highway and Transportation Officials approved a request by the District of Columbia to eliminate the entirety of I-695 and renumber it as an extension of I-395. I-395's previous route along the 3rd Street Tunnel is to be renumbered as a new I-195. Although the Federal Highway Administration also approved the request on April 23, The District Department of Transportation subsequently delayed updating signage in the area. This prompted renewed pressure on the District Department of Transportation from the Federal Highway Administration in September 2023, as both printed and digital maps were beginning to show the long-since-approved but still unsigned designations. The Federal Highway Administration stated at the time they would work with District Department of Transportation to start resigning work before the end of 2023.

Instead, on March 15, 2024, the District Department of Transportation submitted a letter to the American Association of State Highway and Transportation Officials asking for rescission of the numbering changes. The District Department of Transportation admitted that work on the re-signing had not started and would take an estimated two to three years, and sought to reduce the increasing confusion caused by updated third-party maps. The American Association of State Highway and Transportation Officials approved this on May 7, with the District Department of Transportation stating it would re-apply for the same numbering changes when the work was closer to completion. The Federal Highway Administration, which is responsible for updating the designations within the National Highway System, as well as producing maps, did not take any action on the request. The agency told WTOP that it had "reviewed and provided comments" and "expects an updated request from the District soon".

=== 14th Street bridges rehabilitation ===
Plans to rehabilitate the Arland D. Williams Jr. Memorial Bridge, which carries northbound I-395 and US 1 over the Potomac River, have been in the works since inspections between 2005 and 2009 revealed that the bridge was deteriorating. A small $27-million (equivalent to $37 million in 2024) project was done between 2010 and 2011, but a 2014 inspection revealed that the bridge still had problems. However, DDOT pushed the date to fix the problems until 2020 due to the expense and the need to replace or repair several deficient bridges elsewhere in DC. On April 13, 2023, the District Department of Transportation announced the US Department of Transportation had provided $72 million to help fund the rehabilitation project. The $90-million project, which will also be funded in part by the DC government, would start with preliminary engineering and the environmental review for the project later that spring, with the preliminary design expected to be completed later that year. Construction is estimated to take two years.

== Exit list ==
Exits in Washington, D.C. were unnumbered until 2008. In 2014, in conjunction with the rebuilding of the 11th Street Bridges and the Southeast Freeway, some exit numbers were converted to a mileage-based numbering system.

| State/district | County | Location | mi | km | Old exit | New exit | Destinations | Notes |
|---|---|---|---|---|---|---|---|---|
| Virginia | Fairfax | Springfield | 0.00 | 0.00 | | 1A | I-95 south – Richmond | Southern terminus; part of Springfield Interchange |
| Virginia | Fairfax | Springfield | 0.00 | 0.00 | | — | I-95 Express south – Richmond | South end of I-395 Express lanes; part of Springfield Interchange |
| Virginia | Fairfax | Springfield | 0.00 | 0.00 | | 1B | SR 644 – Franconia, Springfield | Part of Springfield Interchange; southbound exit and northbound entrance |
| Virginia | Fairfax | Springfield | 0.00 | 0.00 | | — | I-495 north (Capital Beltway Inner Loop) / I-95 Express north – Baltimore, Tysons Corner | Part of Springfield Interchange; southbound exit and northbound entrance for Express lanes only |
| Virginia | Fairfax | Springfield | 0.00 | 0.00 | | 1C | I-95 north / I-495 east – Baltimore | Part of Springfield Interchange; southbound exit and northbound entrance |
| Virginia | Fairfax | Springfield | 0.00 | 0.00 | | 1D | I-495 north – Tysons Corner | Part of Springfield Interchange; southbound exit and northbound entrance |
| Virginia | Fairfax | Springfield | 0.40 | 0.64 | | 2 | SR 648 (Edsall Road) | Signed as exits 2A (east) and 2B (west); access to Industrial Park northbound |
| Virginia | Fairfax | Springfield | 1.10 | 1.77 | | — | I-395 Express | |
| Virginia | City of Alexandria | | 2.00 | 3.22 | | 3 | SR 236 (Duke Street / Little River Turnpike) – Landmark, Lincolnia | Signed as exits 3A (east) and 3B (west) northbound; access to Quantrell Avenue southbound |
| Virginia | City of Alexandria | | 3.70 | 5.95 | | 4 | Seminary Road (SR 420) | Includes full access to and from Express lanes |
| Virginia | City of Alexandria | | 4.60 | 7.40 | | 5 | SR 7 (King Street) – Alexandria, Falls Church | |
| Virginia | Arlington | Shirlington | 5.40 | 8.69 | | 6 | Shirlington | Southbound access is part of exit 7; includes exit ramp to Quaker Lane; Roundabout interchange |
| Virginia | Arlington | Shirlington | 5.40 | 8.69 | | — | Shirlington | Southbound exit and northbound entrance via Express lanes only |
| Virginia | Arlington | Shirlington | 5.90 | 9.50 | | 7 | SR 120 (South Glebe Road) – Marymount University, Shirlington | Signed as exits 7A (south) and 7B (north/Marymount) northbound; southbound exit includes exit ramp to Quaker Lane |
| Virginia | Arlington | Arlington Ridge | 6.90 | 11.10 | | 8A | SR 27 west (Washington Boulevard) to SR 244 (Columbia Pike) / South Arlington Ridge Road – Pentagon South Parking | SR 244 (Columbia Pike) signed northbound only; Pentagon South Parking/South Arlington Ridge Road signed southbound only |
| Virginia | Arlington | Pentagon City | | | | — | SR 27 east – Arlington Memorial Bridge | Northbound exit and southbound entrance via Express lanes only |
| Virginia | Arlington | Pentagon City | 7.50 | 12.07 | | 8B | SR 27 east (Washington Boulevard) – Pentagon, Arlington Cemetery, Rosslyn | Northbound exit and southbound entrance |
| Virginia | Arlington | Pentagon City | | | | — | Eads Street – Pentagon, Pentagon City | Express Lanes only |
| Virginia | Arlington | Pentagon City | 8.00 | 12.87 | 9 | 8B | SR 110 north to I-66 west – Rosslyn | Southbound exit and northbound entrance |
| Virginia | Arlington | Crystal City | 8.40 | 13.52 | 9 | 8C | US 1 south – Pentagon City, Crystal City, Reagan National Airport, Alexandria | Southern terminus of concurrency with US 1; left exit southbound; northbound signed as "To US 1" |
| Virginia | Arlington | Crystal City | 8.50 | 13.68 | | — | I-395 Express north | Northbound exit and southbound entrance |
| Virginia | Arlington | Crystal City | 8.70 | 14.00 | 10 | 9 | Clark Street | Exit closed in 2023 |
| Virginia | Arlington | Long Bridge Park | 8.90– 9.00 | 14.32– 14.48 | 10 | 10A | Boundary Channel Drive – Pentagon North Parking | |
| Virginia–D.C. line | Arlington–Washington line | | 8.90– 9.00 | 14.32– 14.48 | 11 | 10B-C | George Washington Parkway – Memorial Bridge, Reagan National Airport, Mount Vernon | Signed as exits 10B (south) and 10C (north) |
| Virginia–D.C. line | Arlington–Washington line | | 8.90– 9.00 | 14.32– 14.48 | 14th Street Bridges over the Potomac River | | | |
| District of Columbia | Washington | East Potomac Park | 9.91 | 15.95 | | 1 | US 1 north (14th Street) – National Mall | Northern terminus of US 1 concurrency; northbound exit and southbound entrance; includes access to/from HOV lanes |
| District of Columbia | Washington | East Potomac Park | 10.01 | 16.11 | | 2 | Potomac Park, U.S. Park Police | Access via Ohio Drive |
| District of Columbia | Washington | East Potomac Park | 10.21 | 16.43 | | — | To I-395 Express south | Northern terminus of I-395 Express Lanes |
| District of Columbia | Washington | Washington Channel | 10.21 | 16.43 | Francis Case Memorial Bridge over the Washington Channel | | | |
| District of Columbia | Washington | Southwest Federal Center–Southwest Waterfront line | 10.31 | 16.59 | | 3 | 12th Street Expressway north – Capital One Arena | No entrance ramps; southbound exit is part of exit 4 |
| District of Columbia | Washington | Southwest Federal Center–Southwest Waterfront line | | | | | 9th Street Expressway | No exit ramps |
| District of Columbia | Washington | Southwest Federal Center–Southwest Waterfront line | 10.71 | 17.24 | | 4 | Maine Avenue – Southwest Waterfront, Nationals Park | No entrance ramps |
| District of Columbia | Washington | Southwest Federal Center–Southwest Waterfront line | 10.91 | 17.56 | | 5 | 6th Street SW / 7th Street SW – L'Enfant Promenade | Southbound exit and northbound entrance |
| District of Columbia | Washington | Southwest Federal Center–Southwest Waterfront line | 10.91 | 17.56 | | 5 | I-695 east to I-295 / DC 295 | Northbound left exit and southbound left entrance; future I-395 north |
| District of Columbia | Washington | I-395 north from this point on is future I-195 (Center Leg Freeway) | | | | | | |
| District of Columbia | Washington | Southwest Federal Center | 11.01 | 17.72 | 2B | 6 | C Street SW – U.S. Capitol, The House | Northbound exit only |
| District of Columbia | Washington | Southwest Federal Center | 11.31 | 18.20 | 2A | 7 | I-695 east to I-295 / DC 295 | Southbound left exit and northbound entrance; western terminus of I-695; future I-395 north |
| District of Columbia | Washington | Southwest Federal Center | | | Southern end of Third Street Tunnel | | | |
| District of Columbia | Washington | Capitol Hill | 11.61 | 18.68 | 2B | 8 | U.S. Capitol | Southbound exit and northbound entrance; via 2nd Street SW |
| District of Columbia | Washington | Capitol Hill | 11.81 | 19.01 | | 9 | U.S. Senate | Northbound exit and southbound entrance; via 1st Street SW |
| District of Columbia | Washington | Judiciary Square | 12.11 | 19.49 | | 10 | Massachusetts Avenue – Amtrak | Northbound exit and southbound entrance |
| District of Columbia | Washington | Mount Vernon Square | | | Northern end of Third Street Tunnel | | | |
| District of Columbia | Washington | Mount Vernon Square | 12.81– 13.79 | 20.62– 22.19 | | — | US 50 east (New York Avenue) to I-95 / I-295 / I-495 / Baltimore-Washington Parkway – Baltimore | At-grade intersection |
1.000 mi = 1.609 km; 1.000 km = 0.621 mi: Closed/former; Concurrency terminus; Electronic toll collection; Incomplete access

== Related highways ==
9th Street Expressway and 12th Street Expressway
- Location: Washington, D.C.
- Length: 0.9 mi (1,400 m)

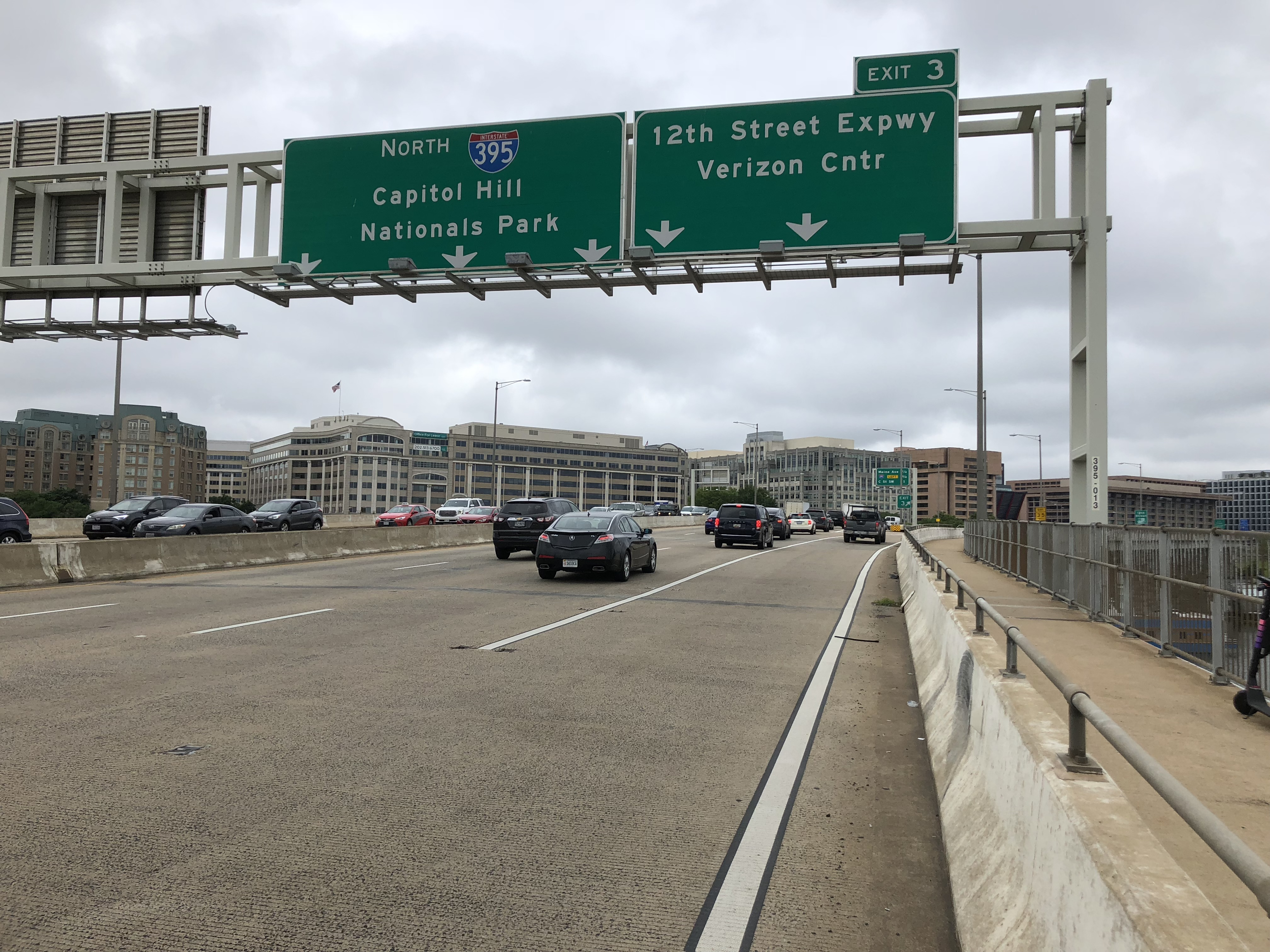
The 12th Street Expressway begins at exit 3 on northbound I-395.

The 9th Street Expressway and the 12th Street Expressway are a one-way pair of freeway spurs connecting I-395 (Southwest Freeway) with US 1 and US 50 (Constitution Avenue) in Washington, D.C. The expressways also provide connections to the L'Enfant Promenade and Independence Avenue. Both highways pass through tunnels under the National Mall and are named for the streets that extend northward from their respective northern termini. The 9th Street Expressway and the 12th Street Expressway run southbound and northbound, respectively, between I-395 and Constitution Avenue.

The 9th Street Expressway begins at the intersection of Constitution Avenue and 9th Street Northwest. The highway heads southbound along the east side of the National Museum of Natural History and descends into the 9th Street Tunnel under the National Mall. The 9th Street Expressway emerges from the tunnel just north of L'Enfant Plaza and receives a ramp from Independence Avenue. At the south end of L'Enfant Plaza, ramps for northbound I-395 and southbound I-395 split from the roadway; the southbound I-395 also provides access to Maine Avenue in the direction of the Tidal Basin. The highway continues south beyond I-395 to an intersection with Maine Avenue at The Wharf (Washington, D.C.).

The 12th Street Expressway begins as a flyover ramp from northbound I-395 as the Interstate crosses the Francis Case Memorial Bridge. Southbound I-395 also has a ramp to the expressway as part of its ramp to Maine Avenue. The two ramps both have exits for the L'Enfant Promenade, specifically D Street Southwest. The expressway's ramps from both directions of I-395 merge and the highway descends into the 12th Street Tunnel, before which the highway receives a ramp from Independence Avenue. The 12th Street Expressway passes under the National Mall and then ascends to the west of the National Museum of Natural History to its terminus at the intersection of Constitution Avenue and 12th Street Northwest.
