= Ohio Drive =

Street in southwestern Washington, DC

- Ohio Drive SW
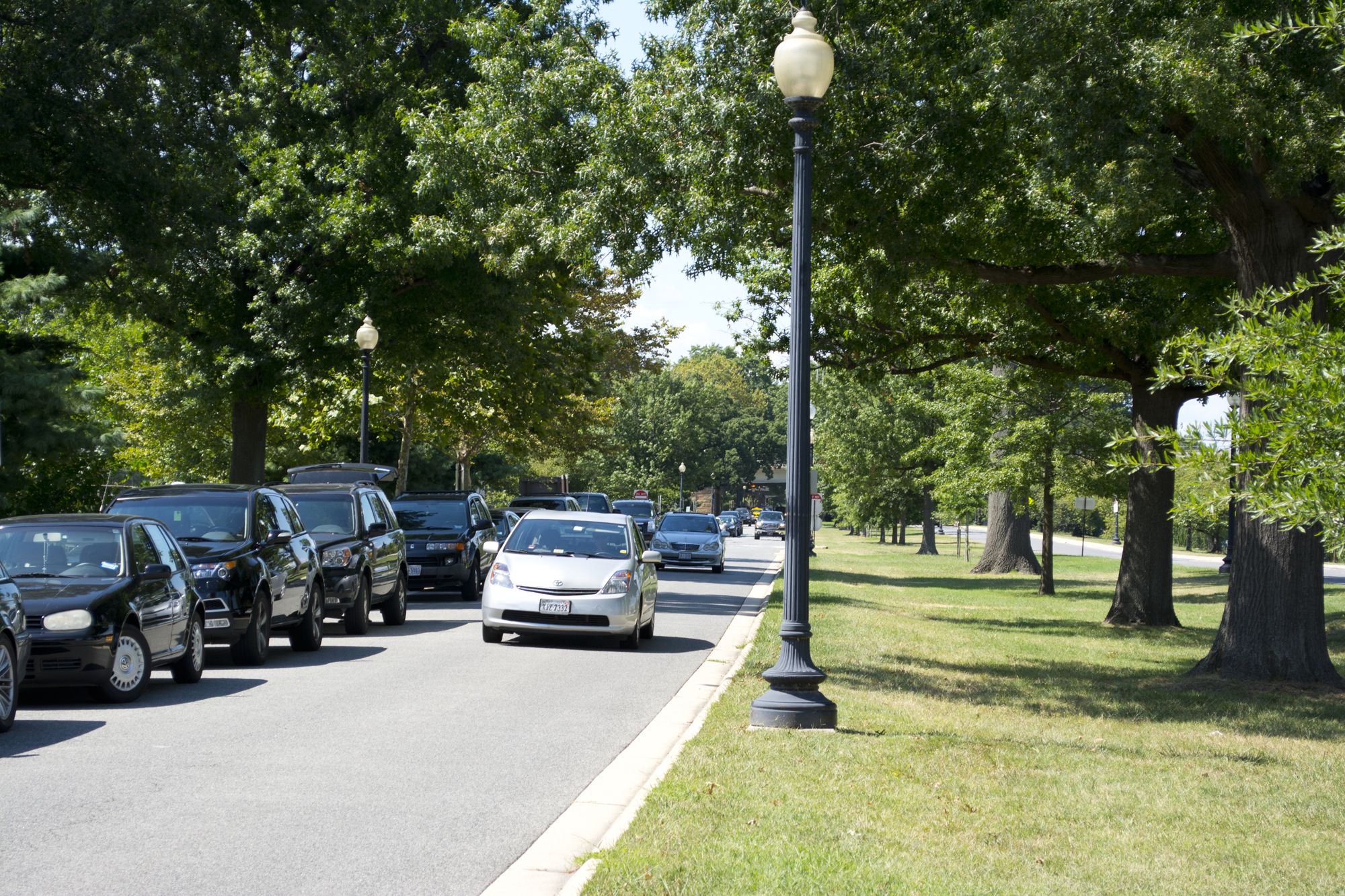
- Looking north along Ohio Drive SW on the eastern shore of East Potomac Park
- Interactive map of Ohio Drive
- Former name: Riverside Drive
- Maintained by: DDOT
- Location: Washington, D.C., U.S.
- Coordinates: 38°52′45.5″N 77°1′49.3″W
- West end: I-66 / US 50 / Rock Creek Parkway
- Major junctions: Lincoln Memorial Circle; Independence Avenue; I-395
- East end: Maine Avenue

Construction
- Construction start: 1912
- Completion: 1916
- Inauguration: 1913

Ohio Drive is a street in Southwest Washington, D.C., located in East and West Potomac Parks and bordering the Tidal Basin, Washington Channel, and the Potomac River. It is a central organizing feature of East Potomac Park, providing the only major vehicular route to and through the area. Unlike most roadways named after states in the District of Columbia, Ohio Drive is not an avenue, nor is it heavily used like Wisconsin or Rhode Island Avenues. However, the segment from Independence Avenue to the Rock Creek and Potomac Parkway is an important commuter route.

Ohio Drive SW is a contributing property to the East and West Potomac Parks Historic District, which was listed on the National Register of Historic Places in November 1973.

It is not to be confused with Ohio Avenue, which ran between 13th and 15th streets NW until the 1920s, when it was eliminated by the construction of Federal Triangle.

== Route description ==
Ohio Drive starts at the Lincoln Memorial and continues south on the west side of West Potomac Park. It crosses a small channel connecting the Potomac River to the Tidal Basin via the Tidal Basin Inlet Bridge, and continues under the 14th Street Bridge and the Washington Metro Yellow Line span. The street enters and continues along the west side of East Potomac Park almost to the southern point of the island, then turns northwest up the eastern side of the island. Ohio Drive passes under 14th Street and CSX railroad tracks before ending at East Basin Drive (where that street connects to Maine Avenue).

== History ==
=== Construction ===
Construction on what was then known as Riverside Drive began in 1912 and was completed in 1916. A portion of it was already finished by June 1913. (President Woodrow Wilson walked along it to take in the view.) The road was nicknamed "The Speedway" from the informal horse and buggy racing that used to occur on the road.

Riverside Drive in West Potomac Park was lit at night using the "Twin Twentys" lamppost. These wrought iron light standards, approved by the United States Commission of Fine Arts, have twin globes connected to a main pole by a decorative U-shaped bracket. The main pole is octagonal in cross-section and 15 feet (4.6 m) high. With the bracket and globes, the lamppost's total height is 21 feet (6.4 m). As constructed, the road was one lane wide and consisted of macadam. At some point between 1916 and 1941, the portion of the road on the east side of the island between the railroad tracks and East Potomac Park Golf Course was turned into a two-lane road divided by a boulevard.

=== Important structures ===
A number of important and historic structures are located on Ohio Drive SW.

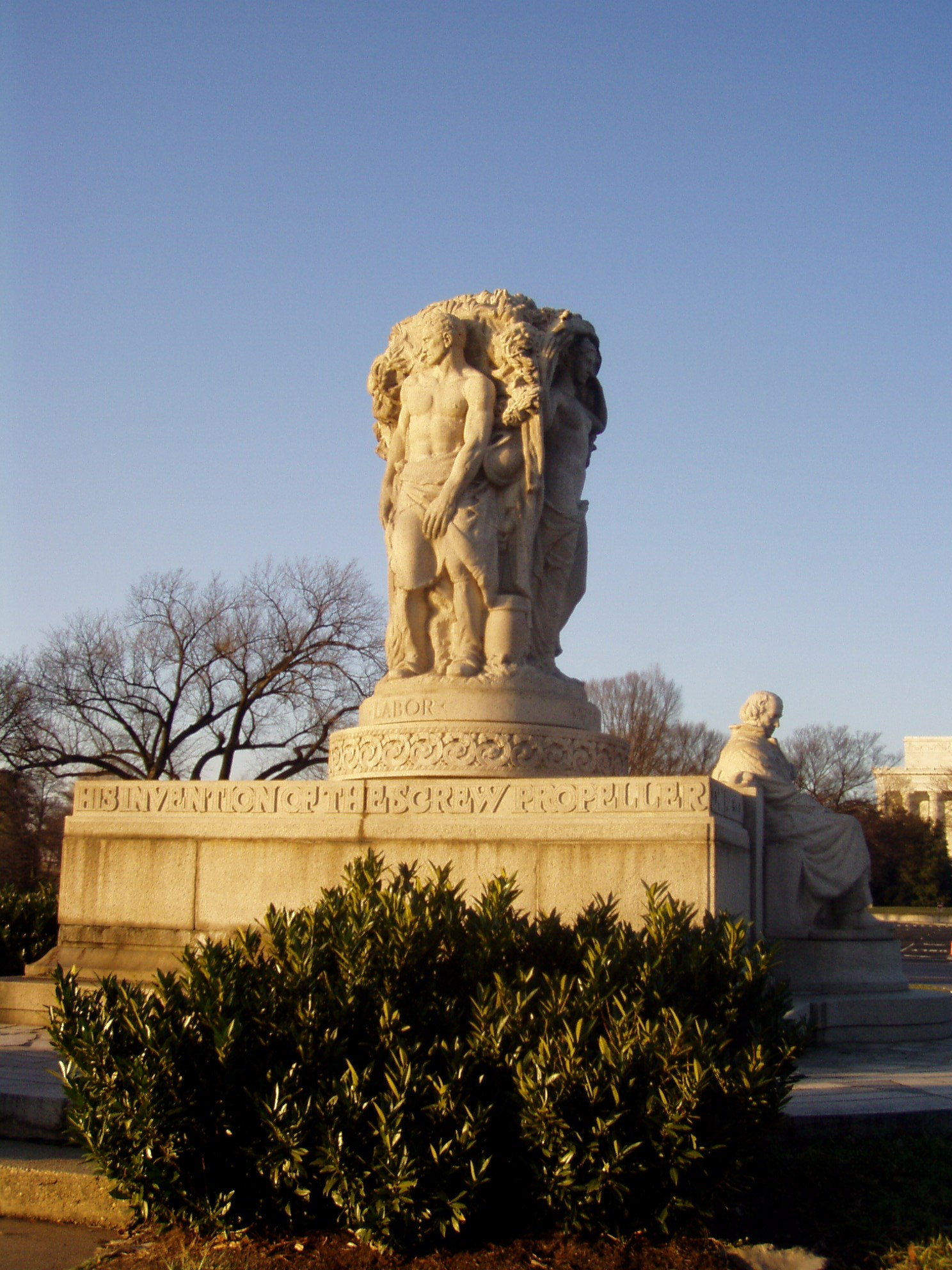
The John Ericsson National Memorial on Ohio Drive SW, whose dedication was attended by the Crown Prince of Sweden.

The West Potomac Park Polo Grounds, located between Independence Avenue SW and Ohio Drive SW, were laid out in 1908. Paved over in 1942 to provide parking for the temporary United States Department of War offices on the National Mall, the southern half was restored to athletic fields in 1943. A Women Appointed to Voluntary Emergency Services (WAVES) dormitory was constructed on the remaining parking lot in 1944. The dormitory was demolished in 1965, and the area at last completely restored to athletic fields.

In 1926, the John Ericsson National Memorial was erected on Riverside Drive SW near the Lincoln Memorial. This statue commemorates the contributions of John Ericsson, a Swedish immigrant and designer of USS Monitor ironclad warship during the American Civil War. President Calvin Coolidge and Prince Gustaf Adolf, Duke of Västerbotten, Crown Prince of Sweden, attended the dedication ceremonies.

Riverside Drive was renamed Ohio Drive by 1950.

Cherry trees are also a defining feature of Ohio Drive. In the 1930s, a large grove of Yoshino cherry trees were planted on both sides of the street in the northwestern corner of West Potomac Park. From 1966 to 1968, more than 1,800 Yoshino cherry and other trees were planted along Ohio Drive SW in East Potomac Park. The trees were donated and planted by friends of President Lyndon B. Johnson and First Lady Lady Bird Johnson in honor of Lady Bird Johnson's continuing efforts at civic beautification nationwide. A plaque commemorating the planting of these trees is located on the east shore of East Potomac Park on Ohio Drive. The cherry trees, according to the National Park Service, "are a major character-defining component of the landscape of East Potomac Park" and are also considered a contributing property to the East and West Potomac Parks Historic District.

In 1957, another major memorial was erected on Ohio Drive SW and West Basin Drive SW. This object is a 2-short-ton (1.8 t) stone Japanese Pagoda. The stone pagoda is a gift from the people of Yokohama, Japan, to the people of Washington, D.C. It arrived on June 19, 1957, in five separate pieces and was assembled on-site. Yokohama mayor Ryozo Kiranuma helped dedicate it once it was erected. This stone pagoda is also a contributing property to the East and West Potomac Parks Historic District.

Another historic object on Ohio Drive SW is the First Air Mail Flight Marker. This object consists of a brass plaque attached to a boulder next to the Polo Grounds south of Ohio Drive SW. It was dedicated on May 15, 1958, by the District of Columbia to mark the spot where the aircraft took off with the first scheduled domestic air mail service. The original marker was stolen in 1969 and the plaque was replaced in 1971.

=== National Capital Parks structures ===
Two major National Capital Parks structures are located on Ohio Drive SW. The first is the headquarters of the National Capital Parks Central Office, which is at 900 Ohio Drive SW.

The second is the U.S. Engineers' Storehouse, also located at 900 Ohio Drive SW. This structure was designed in 1912 by the noted local architectural firm of Wood, Donn and Deming. The Mediterranean Revival style building was constructed in 1913. This building is also a contributing property to the East and West Potomac Parks Historic District.

== Confusion with Ohio Avenue ==
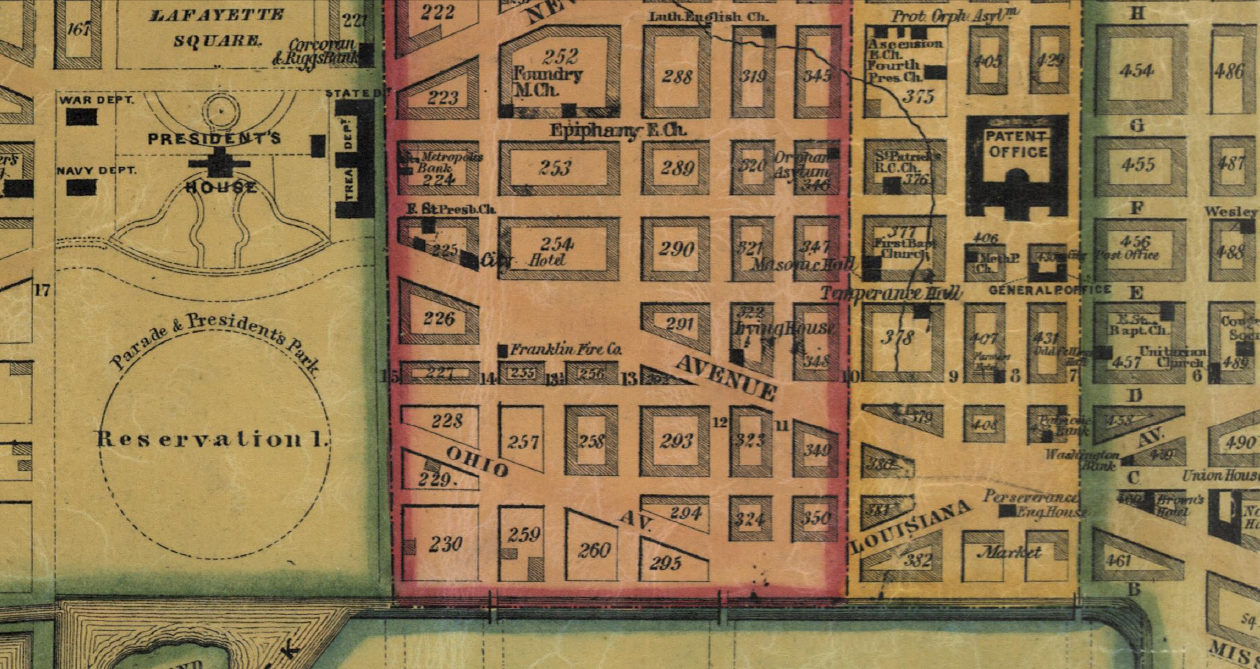
Ohio Avenue in 1851

Ohio Drive should be distinguished from Ohio Avenue. Ohio Avenue was part of the original L'Enfant Plan for the District of Columbia. It began on 15th Street NW, halfway between C and D Streets NW, and ran southeast (parallel to Pennsylvania Avenue) until it reached a small plaza at 12th Street NW. The avenue was obliterated in the early 20th century by the Federal Triangle complex. The Ronald Reagan Building and International Trade Center, Herbert C. Hoover Building, and Internal Revenue Service Building currently sit on the path of the old Ohio Avenue.
