= U.S. Route 1 in the District of Columbia =

Section of U.S. Numbered Highway in the District of Columbia, United States

U.S. Route 1
- US 1 highlighted in red

Route information
- Maintained by DDOT
- Length: 7.0 mi (11.3 km)
- Existed: 1926–present

Major junctions
- South end: US 1 / I-395 in Arlington, VA
- I-395 in East Potomac Park; US 50 in Downtown Washington; US 29 in Shaw
- North end: US 1 / Eastern Ave in Mt. Rainier, MD

Location
- Country: United States
- Federal district: District of Columbia

Highway system
- United States Numbered Highway System; List; Special; Divided; Streets and Highways of Washington, DC; Interstate; US; DC; State-Named Streets
| ← I-695 | → US 29 |

U.S. Route 1 (US 1) in Washington, D.C., passes through from Arlington, Virginia, to Mount Rainier, Maryland, predominantly along surface streets. However, it forms a few overlaps with other routes.

== Route description ==
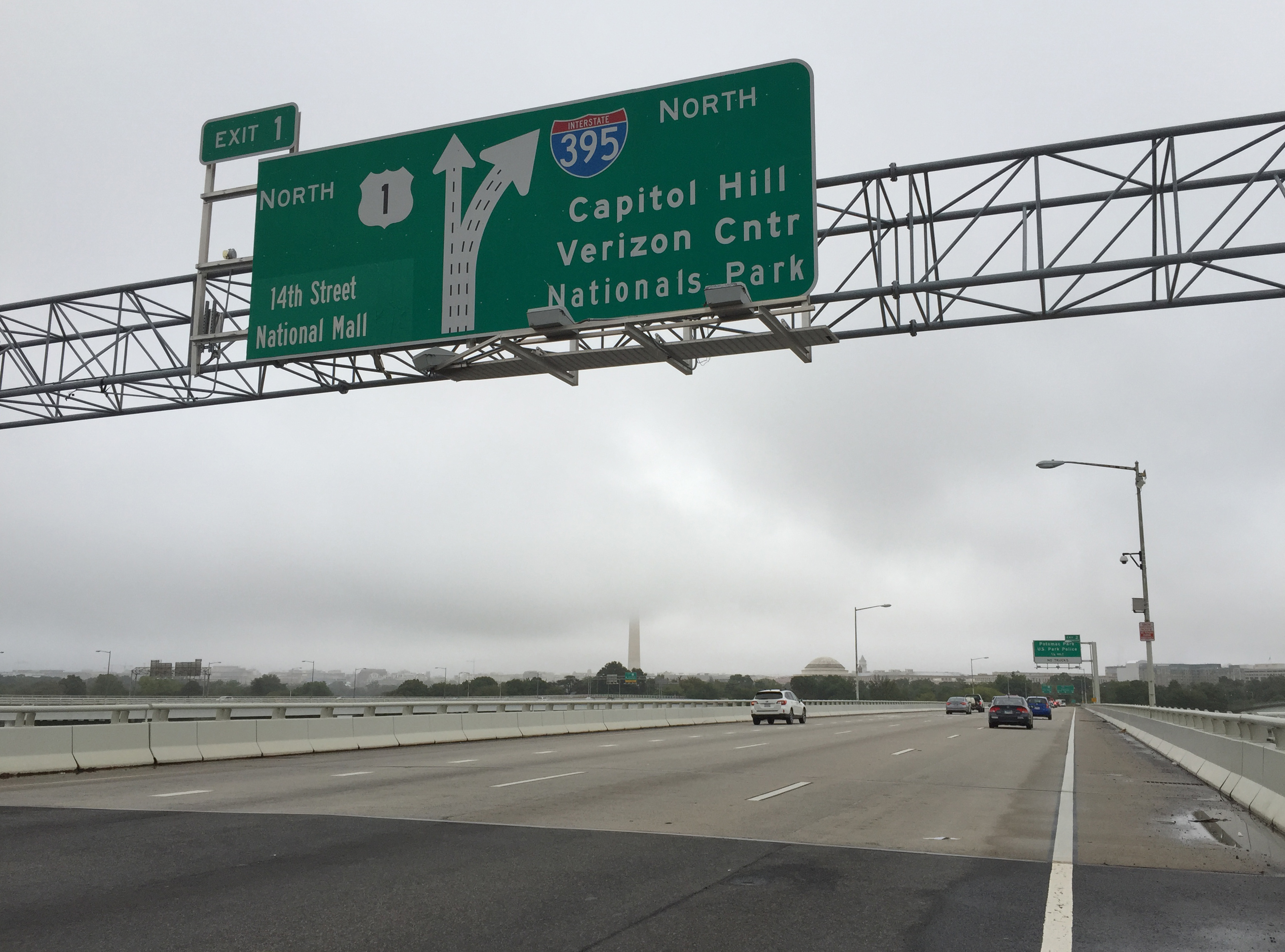
View north along US 1 and I-395 crossing the Potomac River on the 14th Street bridges

Northbound US 1 and Interstate 395 (I-395) enter the District of Columbia from Virginia on the 14th Street bridges. US 1 traffic exits I-395 from the left to 14th Street, Southwest. After 14th Street crosses the National Mall, US 1 turns right onto Constitution Avenue. It then turns left onto 6th Street, Northwest, and then right onto Rhode Island Avenue. US 1 continues on Rhode Island Avenue through Northeast and into Maryland.

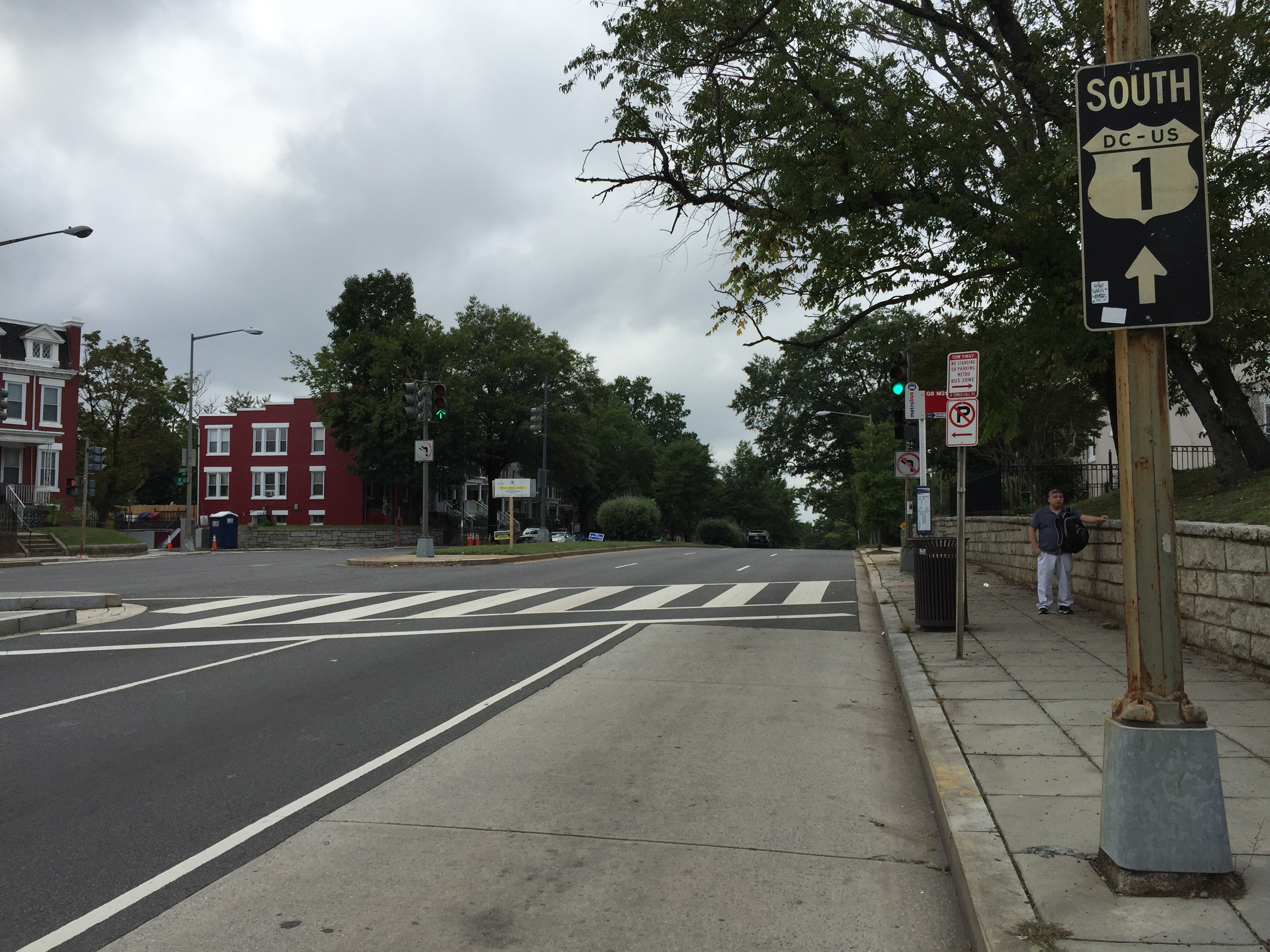
View south along US 1 on Rhode Island Avenue

Southbound US 1 enters the District of Columbia from Maryland on Rhode Island Avenue. US 1 turns left onto 6th Street, NW, then right onto L Street, NW, and then left onto 9th Street, NW. It enters the Ninth Street Tunnel and joins I-395, which it follows into Virginia.

Northbound US 1 is concurrent with eastbound US 50 along Constitution Avenue from 14th Street to 6th Street, NW, and along 6th Street from Constitution Avenue to New York Avenue, NW. Southbound US 1 is concurrent with westbound US 50 along L Street between 6th and 9th streets, NW, and along 9th Street from L Street to Constitution Avenue. Both northbound and southbound US 1 have concurrencies with I-395.

== History ==
When originally designated in 1926, US 1 entered Washington DC on Bladensburg Road. The old route then continued on Maryland Avenue and turned south on 1st Street, where it then turns left into the U.S. Capitol grounds. US 1 went around the Capitol, making its way to Pennsylvania Avenue. The route continues on Pennsylvania Avenue to 14th Street where it turns south. US 1 then left Washington DC on 14th Street as it does today. By 1946, US 1 entered from the north using Rhode Island Avenue continuing all the way to 14th Street (via Vermont Avenue). It was shifted to its current alignment by 1967.

== Major intersections ==
The entire route is in the District of Columbia.

| Location | mi | km | Destinations | Notes |
|---|---|---|---|---|
| Potomac River | 0.0 | 0.0 | I-395 south / US 1 south – Richmond, Alexandria | Continuation into Virginia |
| Potomac River | 0.1– 0.4 | 0.16– 0.64 | 14th Street Bridges (Arland D. Williams Jr. Memorial Bridge / George Mason Memorial Bridge) | |
| East Potomac Park | 0.5 | 0.80 | I-395 north – Capitol Hill, Capital One Arena, Nationals Park | Northern terminus of concurrency with I-395; Exit 1 on I-395; Northbound exit and southbound entrance |
| East Potomac Park | 0.7 | 1.1 | I-395 south (Rochambeau Memorial Bridge) | To HOV 3+ only; Southbound exit and northbound entrance |
| Washington Channel | 0.8 | 1.3 | 14th Street Bridges (US 1 span) | |
| Southwest Federal Center | 0.9 | 1.4 | Maine Avenue SW | Interchange; No southbound exit |
| National Mall–Downtown | 1.5 | 2.4 | US 50 west (Constitution Avenue NW) / 14th Street NW north | Southern terminus of concurrency with US 50, No left turns |
| National Mall–Downtown | 1.7 | 2.7 | 12th Street Expressway / 12th Street NW north | Northern terminus of 12th Street Expressway (one-way northbound) |
| National Mall–Downtown | 2.0 | 3.2 | 9th Street Expressway south to I-395 US 1 north / US 50 east | Northern terminus of 9th Street Expressway (one-way southbound); Southern terminus of one-way pairs (6th Street NW north / 9th Street NW south) |
| Downtown | 2.2 | 3.5 | US 1 Alt. north (Pennsylvania Avenue NW) | Southern terminus of US 1 Alternate; Access from US 1 north only |
| Mount Vernon Square | 3.0 | 4.8 | US 50 east (New York Avenue NW) to I-495 | Northern terminus of concurrency with US 50 |
| Mount Vernon Square | 3.1 | 5.0 | US 1 south / US 50 west (L Street NW) | Northern terminus of one-way pairs |
| Shaw | 3.6 | 5.8 | US 29 (Rhode Island Avenue NW west / 6th Street NW north) | |
| Woodridge | 7.0 | 11.3 | US 1 north (Rhode Island Avenue) / Eastern Avenue NE – Baltimore | Continuation into Maryland |
1.000 mi = 1.609 km; 1.000 km = 0.621 mi: Concurrency terminus; HOV only; Incomplete access

== Related routes ==
US 1 Alternate leaves US 1 at New York Avenue, following US 50 east, and rejoins the highway in Hyattsville, Maryland.

U.S. Route 1
| Previous state: Virginia | District of Columbia | Next state: Maryland |
