= Washington Channel =

Coordinates: 38°52′16.9″N 77°1′14.9″W

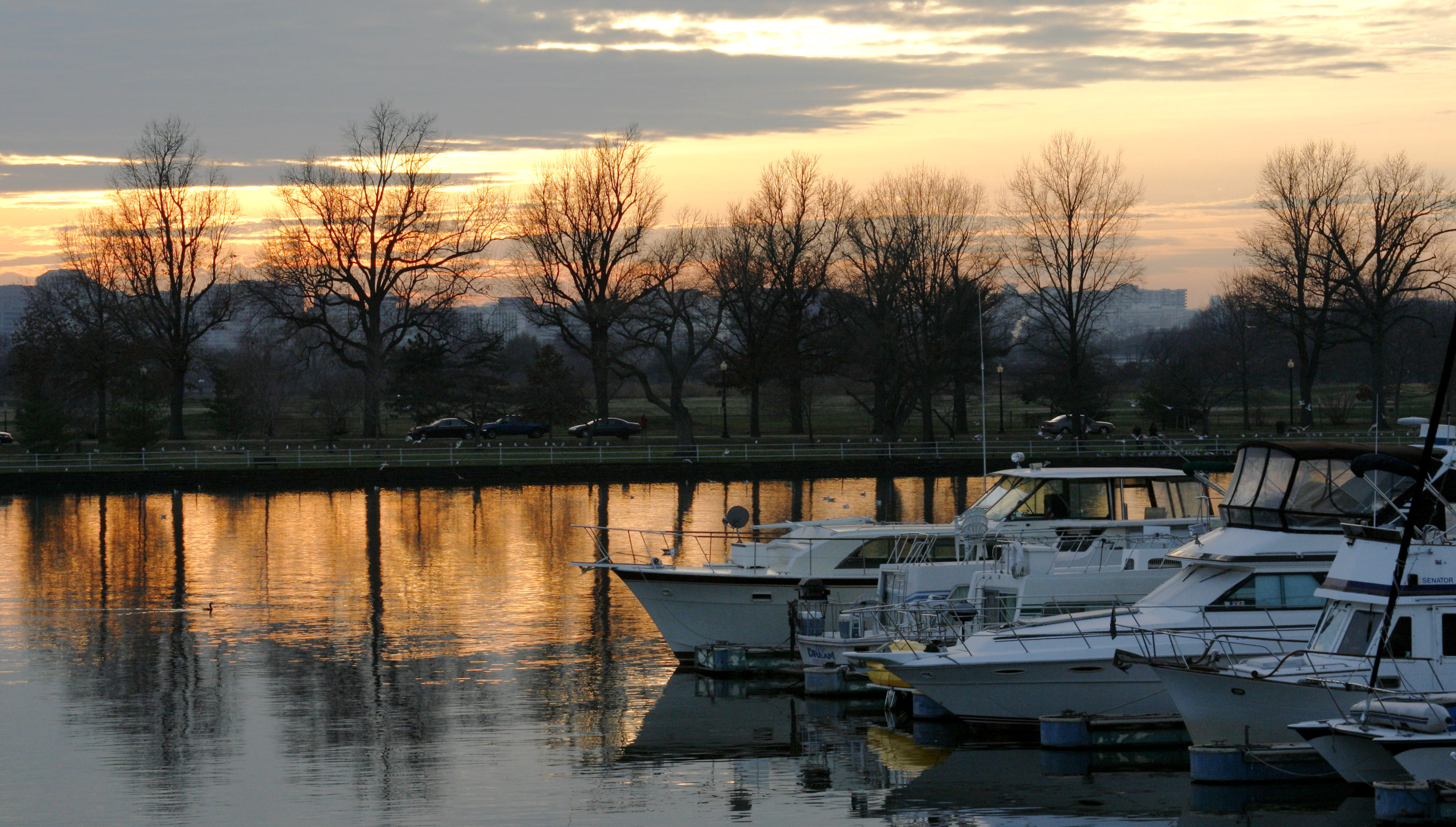
- View of the Washington Channel from the Southwest Waterfront

Location
- Country: United States

Physical characteristics
- Source
  - location: Tidal Basin
  - elevation: 0 feet (0 m)
- Mouth
  - location: Anacostia River at Hains Point
  - elevation: 0 feet (0 m)
- Length: 2 miles (3.2 km)

Basin features
- River system: Potomac River

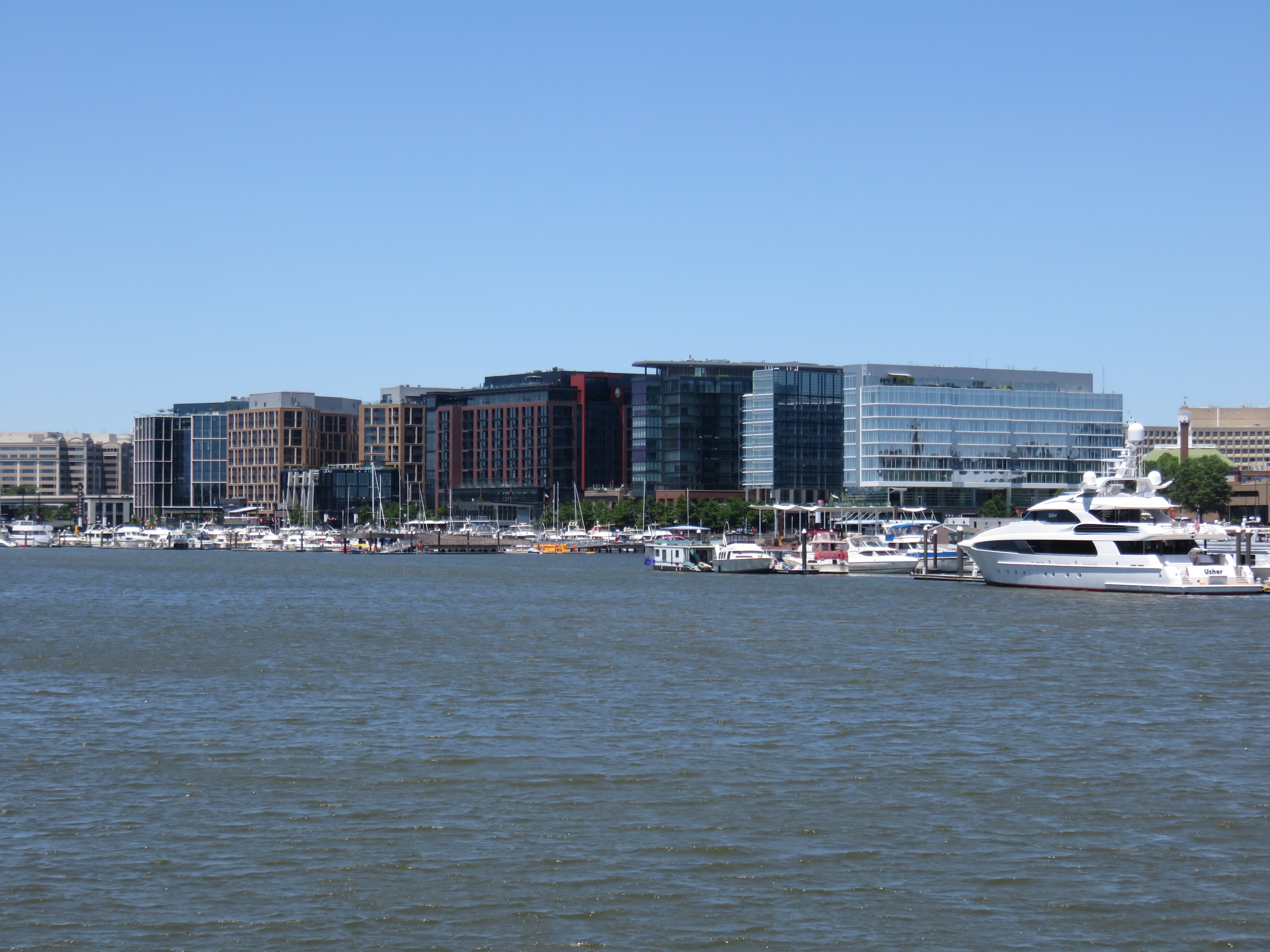
The Wharf development on Washington Channel in 2019

The Washington Channel is a channel parallel to the Potomac River in Washington, D.C. It is located between the Southwest Waterfront on the east side and East Potomac Park on the west side. The channel is two miles (3.2 km) long, receives outflow from the Tidal Basin at its north end, and empties into the Anacostia River at Hains Point at its south end. The channel's depth ranges from 8.8 feet (2.7 m) to 23 feet (7.0 m).

The Washington Channel's east bank is lined with restaurants, inns, and marinas including Washington Marina, Gangplank Marina (the only liveaboard marina in the District of Columbia), and Capital Yacht Club. The Maine Avenue Fish Market is situated at the north end of the channel, south of the 14th Street Bridge complex. The Titanic Memorial, Fort Lesley J. McNair, the National Defense University, and James Creek Marina are located near the south end of the channel. As of August 2010, USS Sequoia—a former United States presidential yacht—is docked at a pier in the Washington Channel.

== Transfer of responsibility ==
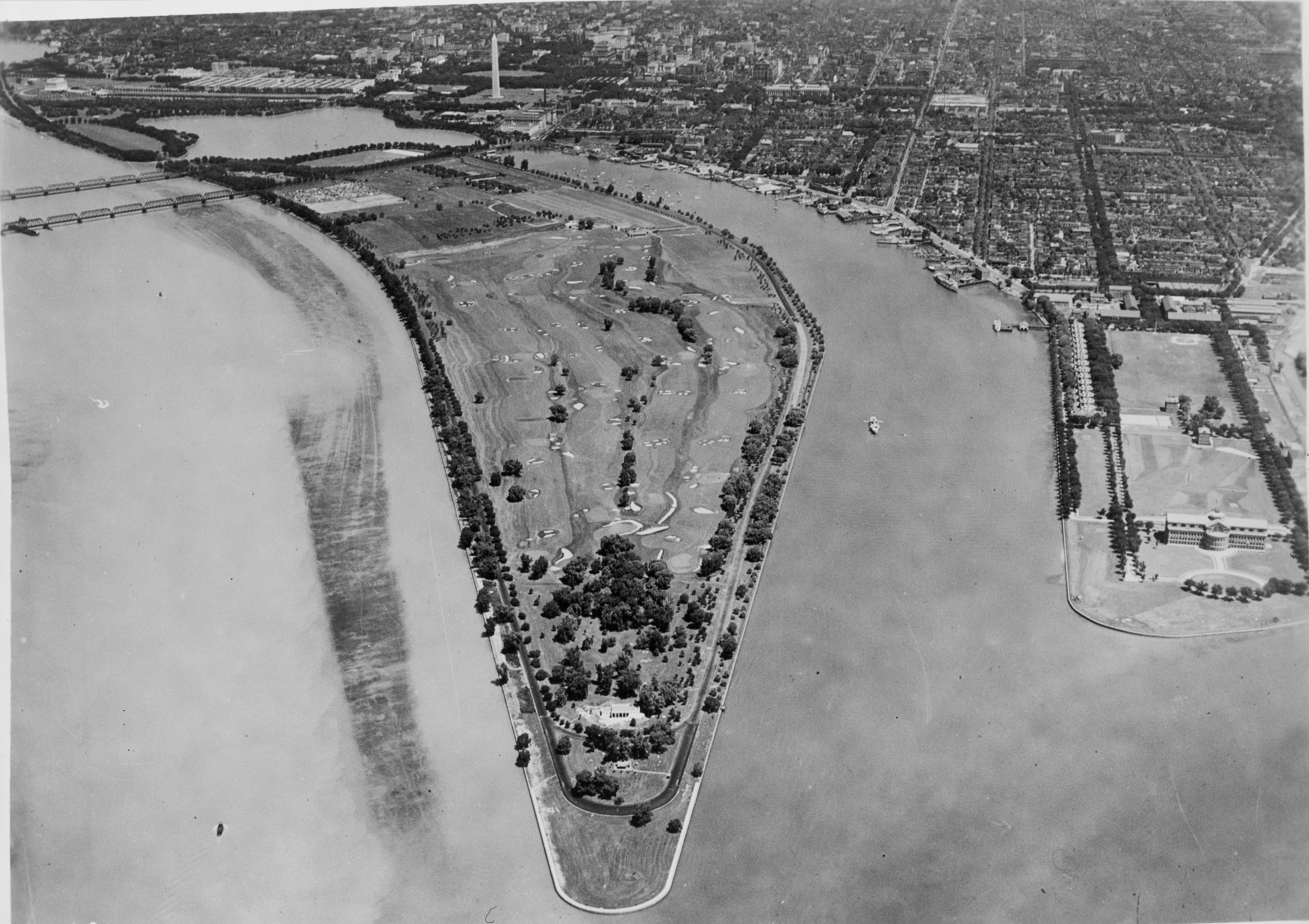
Aerial view from the south of East Potomac Park and the Washington Channel, ca. 1935.

On June 16, 2010, District of Columbia Delegate Eleanor Holmes Norton introduced a bill (H.R. 5545) into the House of Representatives during the 111th United States Congress that would have transferred responsibility for part of the Washington Channel from the Army Corps of Engineers to the District. The House passed the bill on July 20, 2010. The Senate Committee on Environment and Public Works received the bill on the following day.

Norton's bill was part of a larger plan to redevelop the Southwest Waterfront, some goals of which are "to extend docks and increase maritime activity just a short eyeshot from the U.S. Capitol building." The Coast Guard, the Navy, and the Army Corps of Engineers agreed that this transfer "will not affect navigation interests or adversely affect navigation safety." The area under consideration extended from the north end of the Channel to just south of the police pier, totaling 17.84399 acres (7.22121 ha) of water Crossings However, the Senate did not pass the legislation.

Delegate Norton reintroduced the bill into the House of Representatives on February 15, 2011, during the 112th United States Congress. The 2011 bill (H.R. 723) was incorporated into H.R. 2297 (To promote the development of the Southwest waterfront in the District of Columbia, and for other purposes), which became Public Law 112-143 (126 Stat. 990 - 126 Stat. 992) after President Barack Obama signed it on July 9, 2012.

== Crossings ==
- Tidal Basin Outlet Bridge carrying Ohio Drive
- Washington Channel Bridge carrying 14th Street/U.S. Route 1
- CSX Transportation RF&P Subdivision rail bridge
- Francis Case Memorial Bridge carrying Interstate 395
- Washington Metro Yellow Line tunnel
