= National Cherry Blossom Festival =

Annual spring festival

Coordinates: 38°52′54″N 77°2′6″W

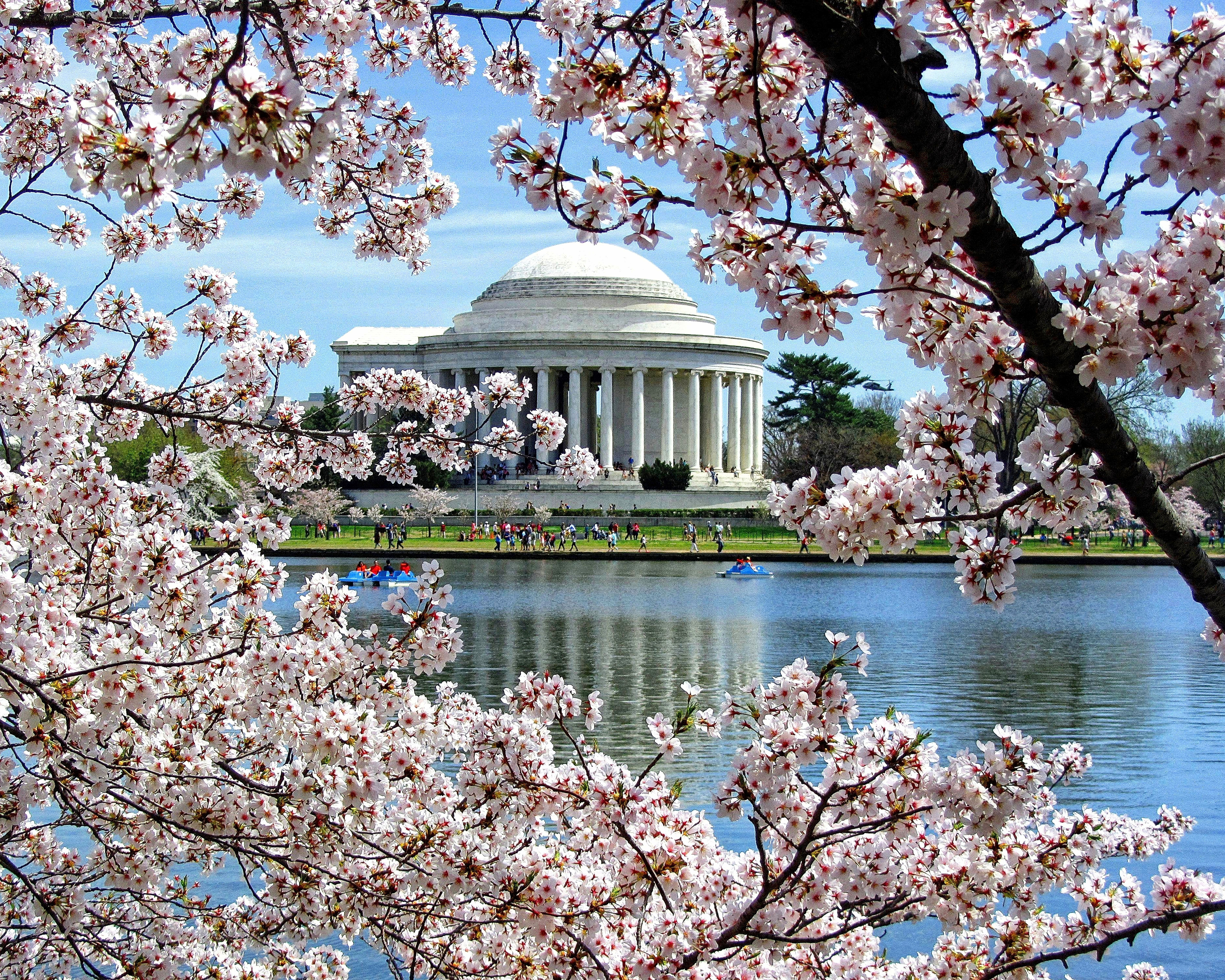
The Jefferson Memorial visible through cherry blossoms across the Tidal Basin

The National Cherry Blossom Festival (Japanese: 全米桜祭り, Zenbei Sakura Matsuri) is a spring celebration in Washington, D.C., commemorating the March 27, 1912, gift of Japanese cherry trees from Mayor Yukio Ozaki of Tokyo City to the city of Washington, D.C. Ozaki gave the trees to enhance the growing friendship between the United States and Japan and also celebrate the continued close relationship between the two nations. Large and colorful helium balloons, floats, marching bands from across the country, music and showmanship are parts of the Festival's parade and other events.

== History of the cherry trees ==
=== Early initiatives ===
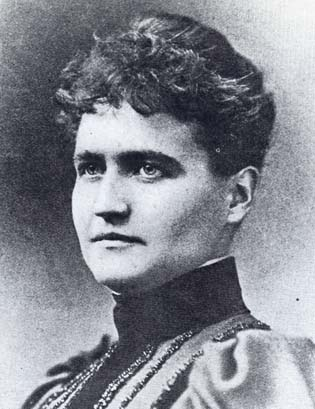
Eliza Ruhamah Scidmore was an early proponent of planting Japanese flowering cherry trees along the Potomac River.

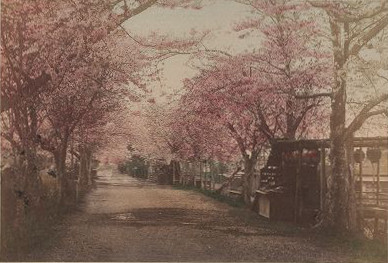
Scidmore admired cherry blossoms in Mukojima, Sumida, Tokyo. Picture published in 1897.

The effort to bring cherry blossom trees to Washington, D.C., preceded the official planting by several decades. In 1885, Eliza Ruhamah Scidmore returned from her first trip to Japan and approached the U.S. Army Superintendent of the Office of Public Buildings and Grounds with the idea of planting cherry trees along the reclaimed waterfront of the Potomac River. Scidmore, who would go on to become the first female board member of the National Geographic Society, was rebuffed, though she would continue proposing the idea to every Superintendent for the next 24 years. Several cherry trees were brought to the region by individuals in this period, including one that was the location of a 1905 cherry blossom viewing and tea party hosted by Scidmore in northwest D.C. Among the guests was prominent botanist David Fairchild and his fiancée Marian, the daughter of inventor Alexander Graham Bell.

In 1906, David Fairchild imported 1000 cherry trees from the Yokohama Nursery Company in Japan and planted them on his own property in Chevy Chase, Maryland. The Fairchilds were pleased with the results of their planting and in 1907 began promoting Japanese flowering cherry trees as an ideal tree to plant around avenues in the Washington area. On September 26, with the help of the Fairchilds' friends, the Chevy Chase Land Company ordered 300 Oriental cherry trees for the Chevy Chase area. In 1908, Fairchild donated cherry saplings to every D.C. school to plant on its school grounds in observance of Arbor Day. At an Arbor Day speech that Eliza Scidmore attended, Fairchild proposed that the "Speedway" (a now non-existing route around the D.C. Tidal Basin) be turned into a "Field of Cherries".

In 1909, Scidmore decided to raise the money to buy cherry trees and donate them to the District. As a matter largely of form, on April 5 she wrote a letter to First Lady Helen Herron Taft, wife of newly elected President Taft, informing her of her plans. Two days later, the First Lady responded:

Thank you very much for your suggestion about the cherry trees. I have taken the matter up and am promised the trees, but I thought perhaps it would be best to make an avenue of them, extending down to the turn in the road, as the other part is still too rough to do any planting. Of course, they could not reflect in the water, but the effect would be very lovely of the long avenue. Let me know what you think about this.

By chance, Jōkichi Takamine, the Japanese chemist who discovered adrenaline, was in Washington with Mr. Kokichi Midzuno, the Japanese consul to New York City, on April 8. Informed of a plan to plant Japanese cherry trees along the Speedway (Ohio Avenue), Takamine asked if Mrs. Taft would accept an additional 2000 trees, while Midzuno suggested that the trees be given in the name of Tokyo. Takamine and Midzuno subsequently met with the First Lady, who accepted the offer of 2000 trees.

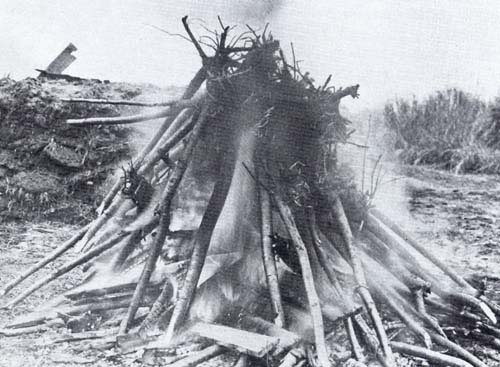
The first gift of 2000 cherry trees was burned by the giftee after a few insects and nematodes were discovered

On April 13, Spencer Cosby, Superintendent of the Office of Public Buildings and Grounds, purchased ninety cherry trees (Prunus serrulata) that were planted along the Potomac River from the Lincoln Memorial south toward East Potomac Park. It was subsequently discovered that the trees were of the cultivar Shirofugen, rather than the ordered Fugenzo. These trees had largely disappeared by the 21st century.

On August 30, 1909, the Embassy of Japan in Washington, D.C., informed the U.S. Department of State that the city of Tokyo intended to donate 2000 cherry trees to the United States to be planted along the Potomac. These trees arrived in Washington, D.C., on January 6, 1910. However, the inspection team from the Department of Agriculture (led by Flora Wambaugh Patterson) found that the trees were infested with insects and nematodes, concluding that the trees had to be destroyed to protect local growers. President Taft gave the order to burn the trees on January 28. Secretary of State Philander C. Knox wrote a letter expressing the regret of all involved to the Japanese Ambassador. Takamine responded to the news with another donation for more trees, 3020 in all, of a lineage taken from a famous group of trees along the Arakawa River in Tokyo and grafted onto stock from Itami, Hyogo Prefecture. On February 14, 1912, 3020 cherry trees of twelve cultivars were shipped on board the Awa Maru and arrived in D.C. via rail car from Seattle on March 26.

=== Japanese gift planted ===
In a ceremony on March 27, 1912, First Lady Helen Herron Taft and Viscountess Chinda, wife of the Japanese ambassador, planted the first two of these trees on the north bank of the Tidal Basin in West Potomac Park. At the end of the ceremony, the First Lady presented Viscountess Chinda with a bouquet of 'American Beauty' roses. These two trees still stand at the terminus of 17th Street Southwest, marked by a large plaque. By 1915, the United States government had responded with a gift of flowering dogwood trees to the people of Japan.

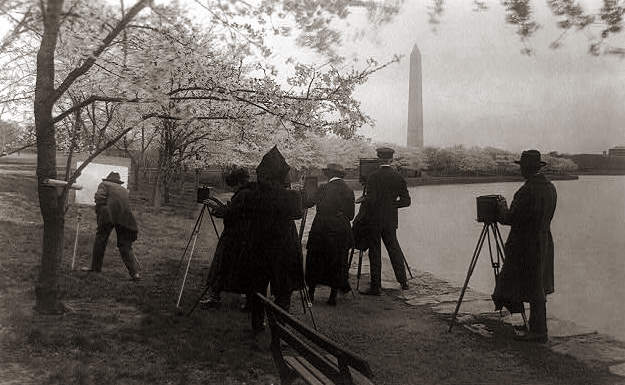
Photographers and painters along the Tidal Basin under blossoming cherry trees, 1920

From 1913 to 1920, trees of the Somei-Yoshino variety, which comprised 1800 of the gift, were planted around the Tidal Basin. Trees of the other 11 cultivars, and the remaining Yoshinos, were planted in East Potomac Park. In 1927, a group of American school children re-enacted the initial planting. This event is recognized as the first D.C. cherry blossom festival. In 1934, the District of Columbia Commissioners sponsored a three-day celebration of the flowering cherry trees.

=== National annual event ===
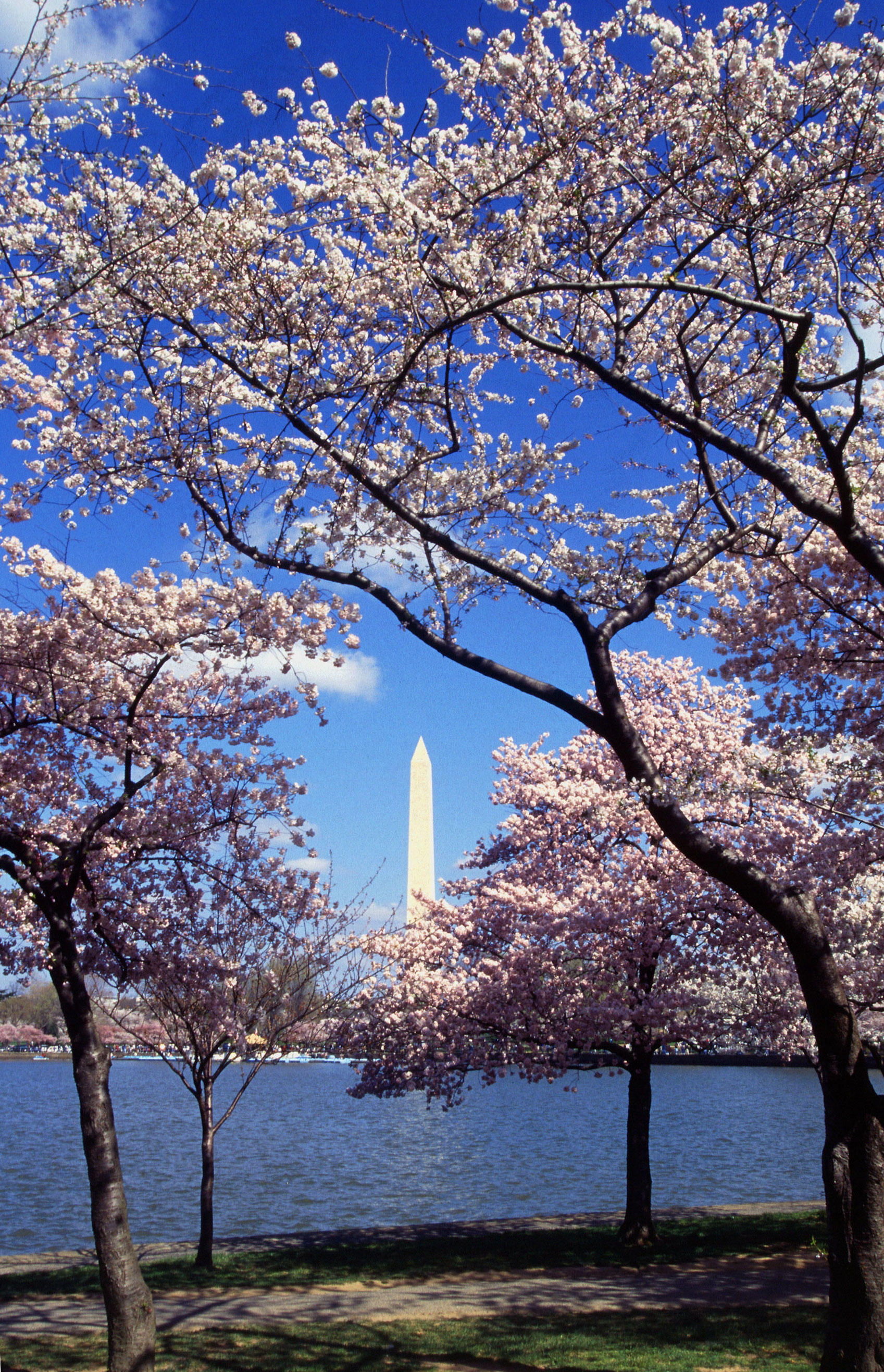
The Washington Monument, as seen from West Potomac Park across the Tidal Basin

The first "Cherry Blossom Festival" was held in late 1934 under joint sponsorship by numerous civic groups, and in 1935 it officially became a national annual event. The cherry trees had by this point become an established part of the nation's capital. In 1938, plans to cut down trees to clear ground for the Jefferson Memorial prompted a group of women to chain themselves together at the site in protest. A compromise was reached where more trees would be planted along the south side of the Basin to frame the Memorial. A Cherry Blossom Pageant was begun in 1940.

In 1937, the Garden Club of America commemorated the 25th Anniversary of the Japanese gift of cherry blossom trees to the U.S., by giving 5,000 flowering trees and plants to Japan. Who better to receive this U.S. goodwill gift than Prince Tokugawa, who had played a pivotal role behind-the-scenes and had introduced the then Mayor of Tokyo Ozaki to the U.S. leaders in Washington, D.C., in 1910, as part of the giving of those cherry blossom trees. It is revealing that in 1937, Prince Tokugawa accompanied by the current mayor of Tokyo are now the representatives of Japan in receiving this gift from the Garden Club of America at a ceremony held at Kiyozumi Park, Tokyo.

Visitors enjoying the cherry blossoms in 1941.

On December 11, 1941, four trees were cut down. It is suspected that this was retaliation for the attack on Pearl Harbor by the Empire of Japan four days earlier, though this was never confirmed. In hopes of dissuading people from further attacks upon the trees during the war, they were referred to as "Oriental" flowering cherry trees for the war's duration. Suspended during World War II, the festival resumed in 1947 with the support of the Washington, D.C., Board of Trade and the D.C. Commissioners.

In 1948, the Cherry Blossom Princess and U.S. Cherry Blossom Queen program were started by the National Conference of State Societies. A Princess was selected from each state and federal territory, with a queen chosen to reign over the festival. In 1952, Japan requested help restoring the cherry tree grove at Adachi, Tokyo, along the Arakawa River, which was the parent stock of the D.C. trees but had diminished during the war. In response, the National Park Service sent budwood back to Tokyo.

A group gets their picture taken during the 1941 festival.

In 1954, the governor of Tokyo gifted the Japanese Lantern, a 300-year-old granite lantern, to the city of Washington to commemorate the signing of the 1854 Japan-US Treaty of Amity and Friendship by Commodore Matthew C. Perry. The lantern was originally carved in 1651 as one of two memorializing Tokugawa Iemitsu and was brought to West Potomac Park from Ueno Park in Taitō, Tokyo, where the other lantern remains. For over 50 years, the lighting of the lantern by the Embassy of Japan's appointed Cherry Blossom Princess has opened the Festival.

Three years later, the president of The Pearl Company started by Mikimoto Kōkichi donated the Mikimoto Pearl Crown. Containing more than 2 lb (1 kg) of gold and 1,585 pearls, the crown is used at the coronation of the Festival Queen at the Grand Ball. The next year, the mayor of Yokohama gave a stone pagoda to the city to "symbolize the spirit of friendship between the United States of America manifested in the Treaty of Peace, Amity and Commerce signed at Yokohama on March 31, 1854."

The Japanese gave 3,800 more Yoshino trees in 1965, which were accepted by First Lady Lady Bird Johnson. These trees were grown in the United States and many were planted on the grounds of the Washington Monument. For the occasion, the First Lady and Ryuji Takeuchi, wife of the Japanese ambassador, reenacted the 1912 planting. In 1982, Japanese horticulturalists took cuttings from Yoshino trees in Washington, D.C., to replace cherry trees that had been destroyed in a flood in Japan. From 1986 to 1988, 676 cherry trees were planted using US$101,000 in private funds donated to the National Park Service to restore the trees to the number at the time of the original gift.

In 1994, the Festival was expanded to two weeks to accommodate the many activities that happen during the trees' blooming. Two years later, the Potomac and Arakawa became sister rivers. Cuttings were taken from the documented 1912 trees in 1997 to be used in replacement plantings and thus preserve the genetic heritage of the grove. In 1999, fifty trees of the Usuzumi variety from Motosu, Gifu, were planted in West Potomac Park. According to legend, these trees were first planted by Emperor Keitai in the 6th century and were designated a National Treasure of Japan in 1922. From 2002 to 2006, 400 trees propagated from the surviving 1912 trees were planted to ensure the genetic heritage of the original donation is maintained.

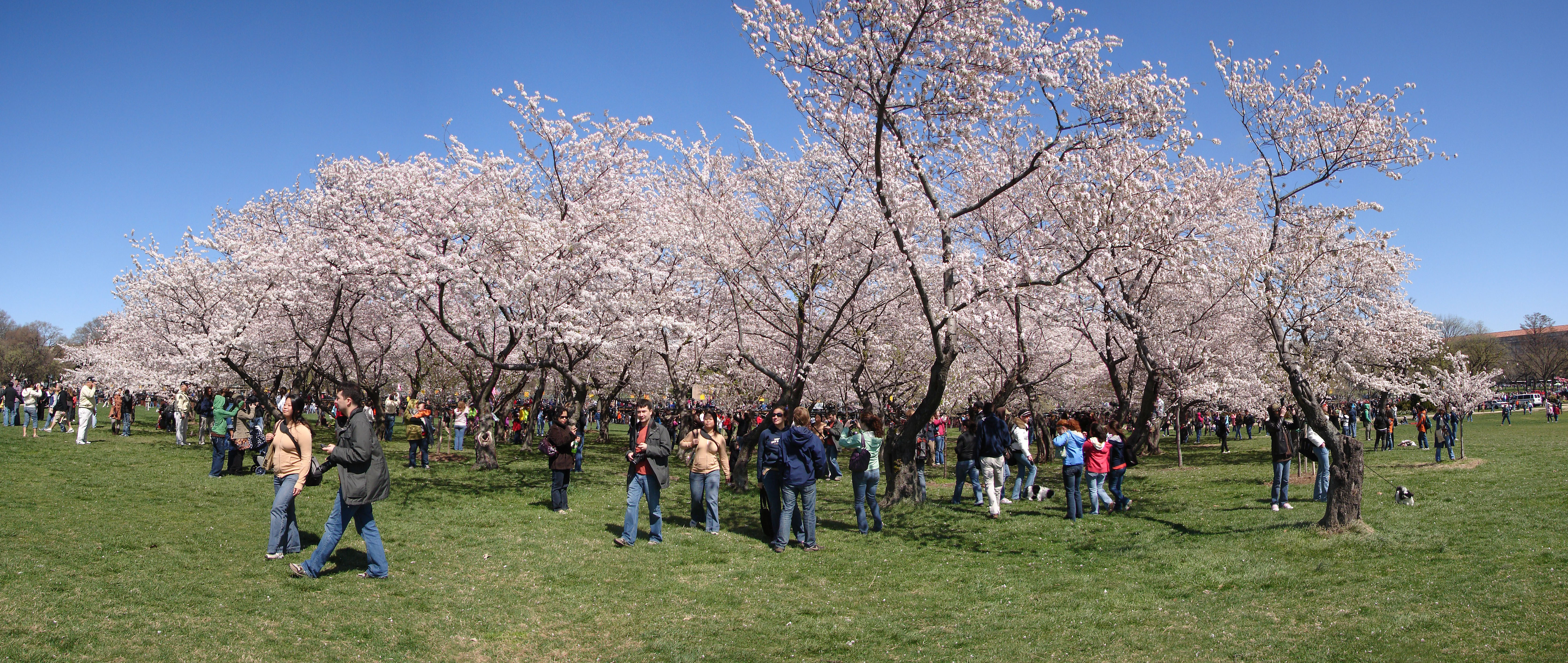
Visitors in a cherry grove on the National Mall, April 5, 2009

== Organization and events ==
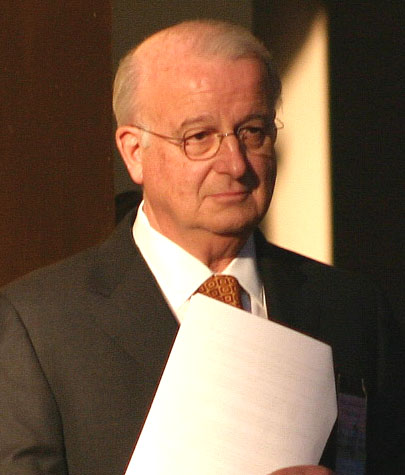
Gordon Peterson as master of ceremonies for the 2006 Cherry Blossom Festival

Family Day at the National Building Museum

The National Cherry Blossom Festival is coordinated by the National Cherry Blossom Festival, Inc., a 501(c)(3) organization consisting of representatives of business, civic, and governmental organizations. More than 700,000 people visit Washington each year to admire the blossoming cherry trees that herald the beginning of spring in the nation's capital.

The three-week festival begins around the middle of March with a Family Day at the National Building Museum and an official opening ceremony in the Warner Theatre. The Pink Tie Party is also held, at which attendees are invited to don their finest pink attire to revel together and toast the spring season. An array of activities and cultural events takes place on the following days. The Blossom Kite Festival (formerly the Smithsonian Kite Festival) usually takes place during the festival's first or second weekend. Every day there is a sushi/sake celebration, classes about cherry blossoms, and a bike tour of the Tidal Basin. Other events include art exhibits (photography, sculpture, animation), cultural performances, rakugo, kimono fashion shows, dance, singing, martial arts, merchant-sponsored events, and a rugby union tournament.

The next Saturday, a three-stage festival takes place on the Southwest Waterfront. When the festival ends, a fireworks show begins on the nearby Washington Channel. The next morning (Sunday), the Credit Union Cherry Blossom Ten Mile Run begins on the grounds of the Washington Monument. Later that Sunday, dignitaries gather at the Tidal Basin to participate in a ceremonial lighting of the 360-year-old Japanese stone lantern.

During the morning of the festival's last Saturday, the National Cherry Blossom Festival Parade travels along Constitution Avenue from 7th to 17th Streets, NW. For 16 years until 2015, the Sakura Matsuri-Japanese Street Festival (Japanese: さくらまつり), the largest Japanese Cultural Festival in the United States, took place throughout the day along 12th Street and Pennsylvania Avenue, NW, near the route of the parade. However, the 2016 Street Festival took place at M Street SE and New Jersey Avenue SE, near the Department of Transportation exit of the Navy Yard-Ballpark Metro station in the distant Capitol Riverfront area. The Street Festival's relocation became necessary when the Trump Organization, which operates the Trump International Hotel in the Old Post Office Pavilion at 12th Street and Pennsylvania Avenue NW, negotiated a deal with the Government of the District of Columbia that requires a 20 feet (6 m)-wide lane on Pennsylvania Avenue to remain open to the hotel's customers and valet parking service except during major events such as presidential inaugural parades, thus leaving insufficient space on the Avenue for the festival's activities.

In 2009, the National Cherry Blossom Festival introduced an alternative event to its lineup, with the debut of Cherry Blast, a mix of art, dance performances, live music, and fashion that took place in an Anacostia warehouse. In 2010, Cherry Blast II—the creation of artist Philippa P. Hughes of the Pink Line Project—moved to a storage warehouse in Adams Morgan, but still featured an eclectic group of local artists and musicians. The 2016 Cherry Blast took place at the Carnegie Library at Mount Vernon Square during the last Saturday evening of the festival.

The event's organizers cancelled many of the events during 2020 because of concerns related to the coronavirus pandemic. Several activities were added to engage the community in the springtime celebration, such as Petal Porches, Art in Bloom, and Paws & Petals.

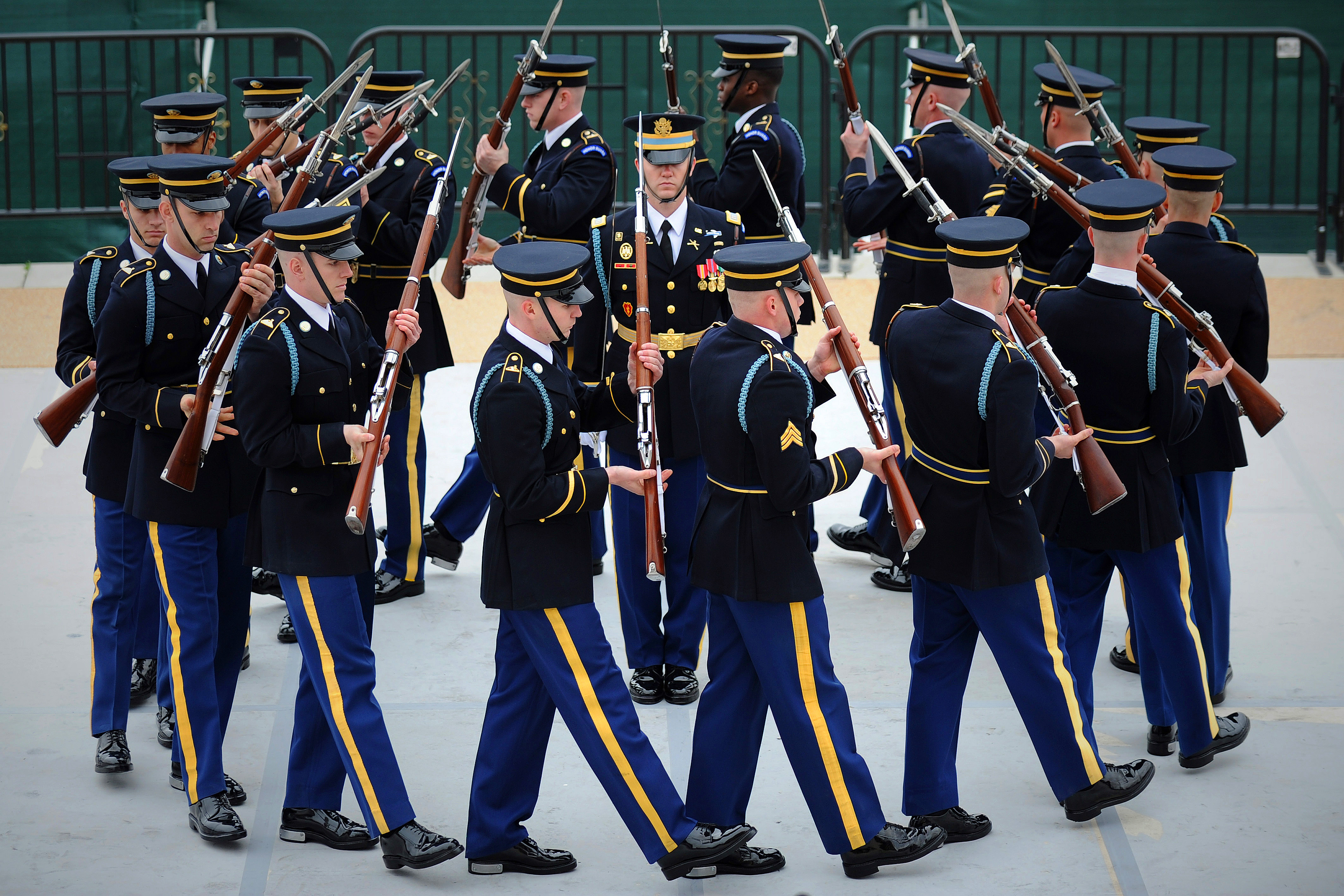
The United States Army Drill Team performing in the 4th Joint Service Drill Exhibition at the National Cherry Blossom Festival in Washington D.C.

== Types of cherry trees ==
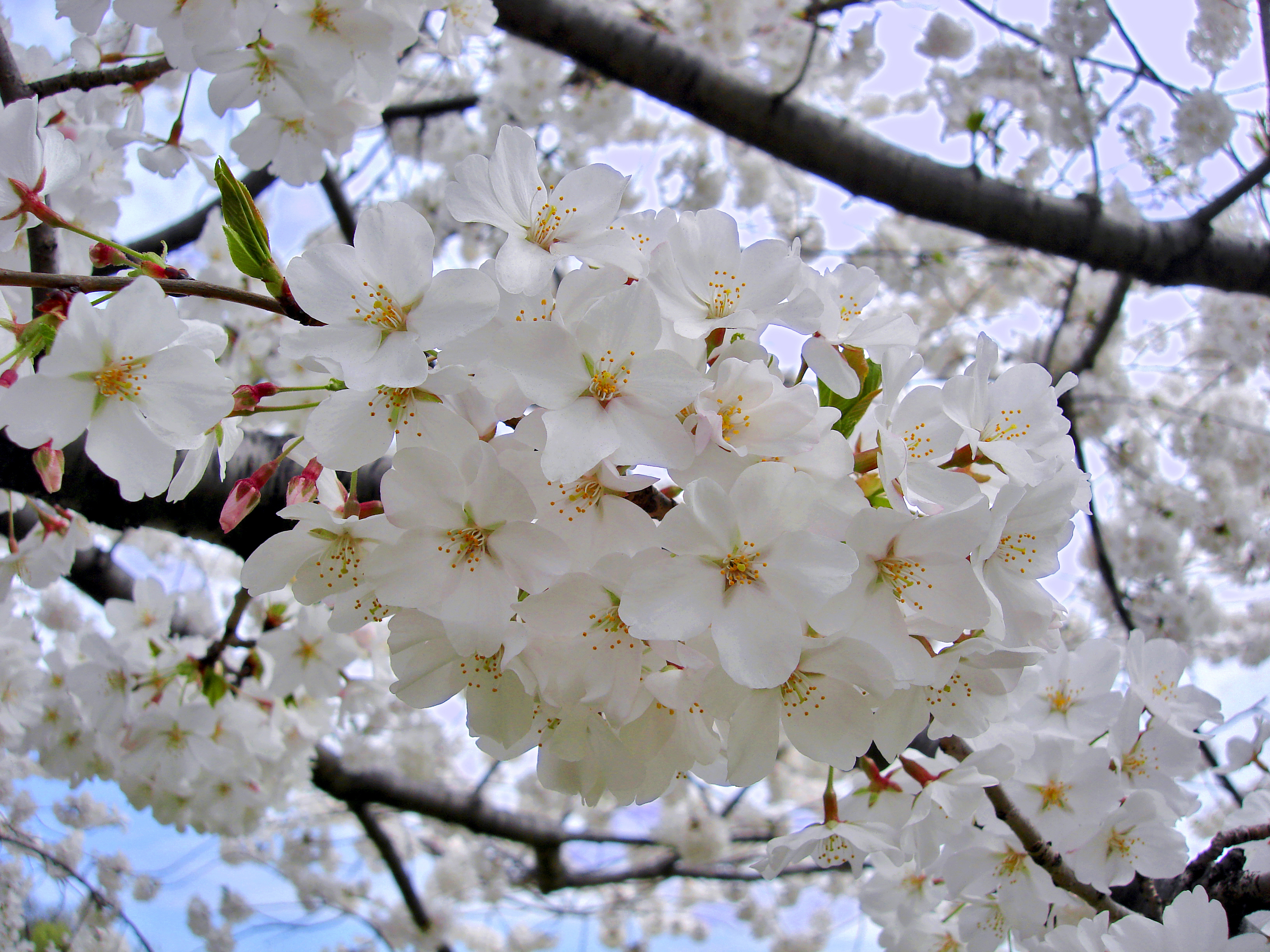
The Yoshino cultivar is the most common in D.C. and can be found encircling the Tidal Basin

Of the initial gift of 12 varieties of 3,020 trees, The Yoshino Cherry (70% of total) and Kwanzan Cherry (13% of total) now dominate.

The first 12 cultivars presented were 'Yoshino', 'Kwanzan', 'Ichiyo', 'Taki-nioi', 'Shirayuki', 'Fugenzo', 'Ariake', 'Jo-nioi', 'Fukurokuju', 'Surugadai-nioi', 'Gyoiko', and 'Mikuruma-gaeshi'. With the exception of 'Yoshino', these 11 cultivars belong to the Sato-zakura group, a complex interspecific hybrid derived from the Oshima cherry. Many cultivars other than 'Yoshino' and 'Kwanzan' are not currently available for viewing because the government didn't obtained them after the original trees reached their maximum age.

The Yoshino produces single white blossoms that create an effect of white clouds around the Tidal Basin and north onto the grounds of the Washington Monument. Intermingled with the Yoshino are a small number of Akebono cherry trees, which bloom at the same time as the Yoshino and produce single, pale-pink blossoms.

The Kwanzan grows primarily in East Potomac Park and comes into bloom two weeks after the Yoshino. It produces clusters of clear pink double blossoms. East Potomac Park also has Fugenzo, which produces rosy pink double blossoms, and Shirofugen, which produces white double blossoms that age to pink.

Interspersed among all the trees are the Weeping Cherry, which produces a variety of single and double blossoms of colors ranging from dark pink to white about a week before the Yoshino. Other cultivars and species that can be found are the Autumn Cherry (semi-double, pink), Sargent Cherry (single, deep pink), Usuzumi (white-grey), and Takesimensis (good in wet areas).

== Gallery ==
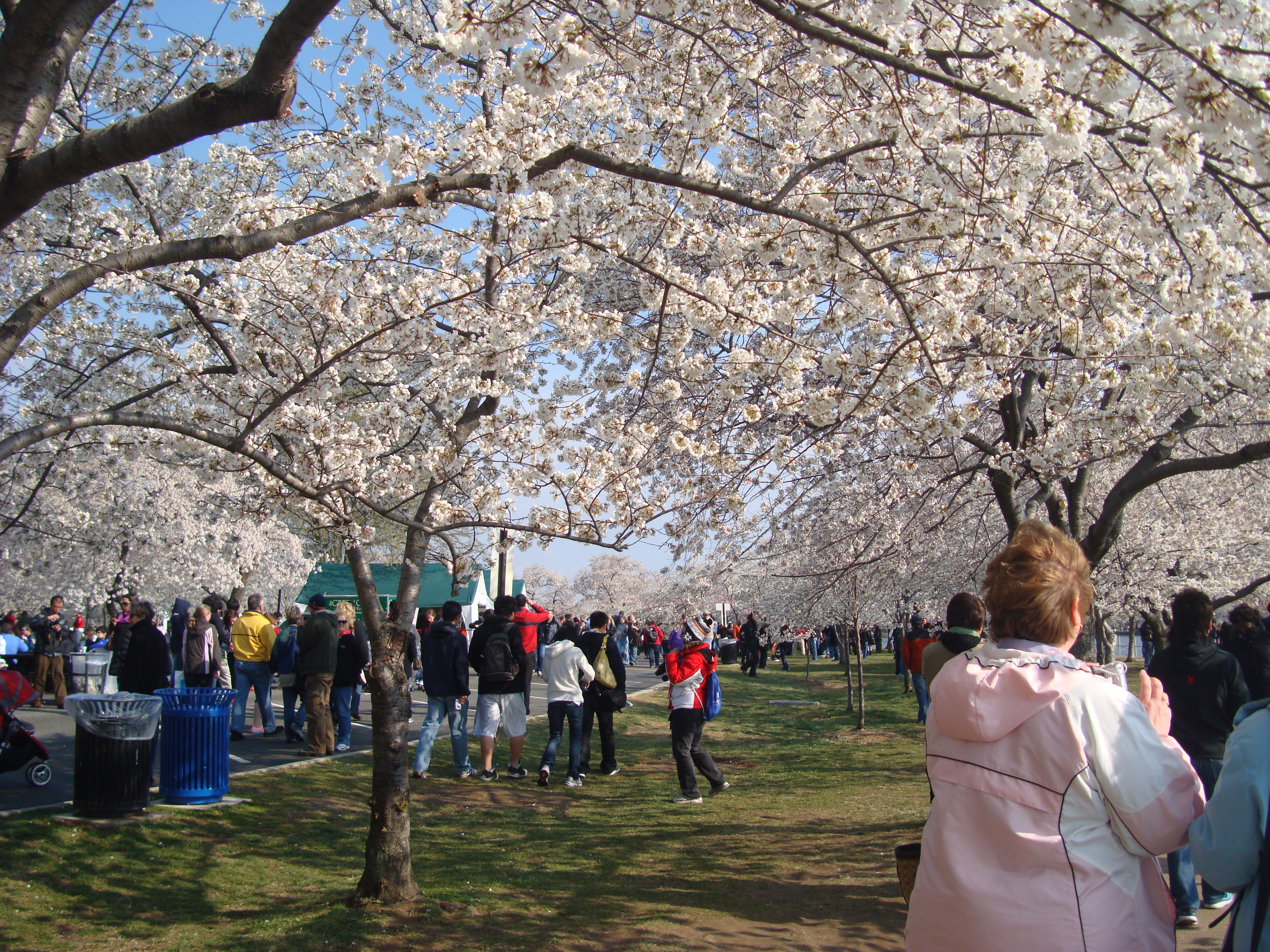
Thousands of people attend the annual Cherry Blossom Festival every spring.

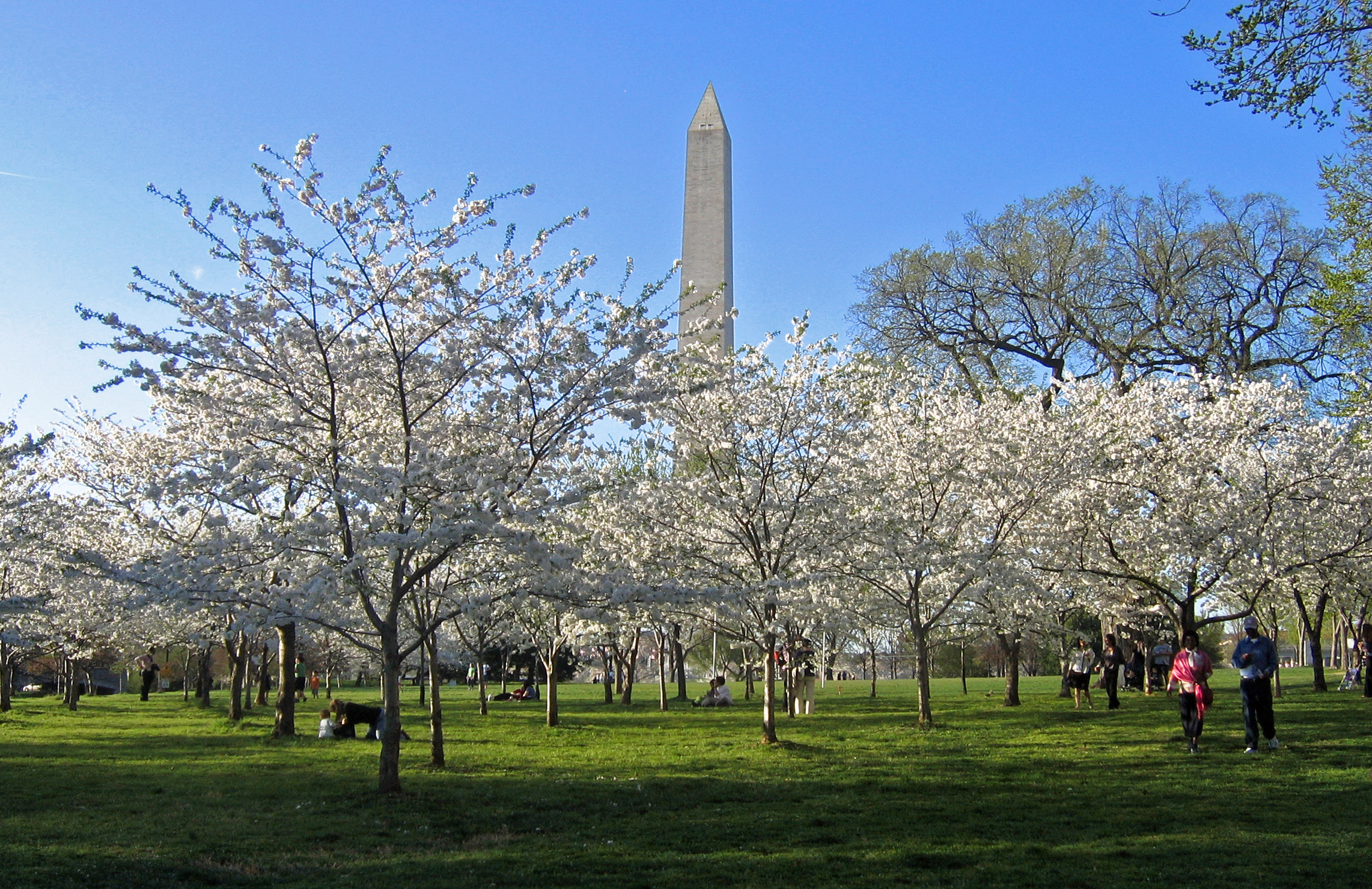
Cherry blossoms on the National Mall.

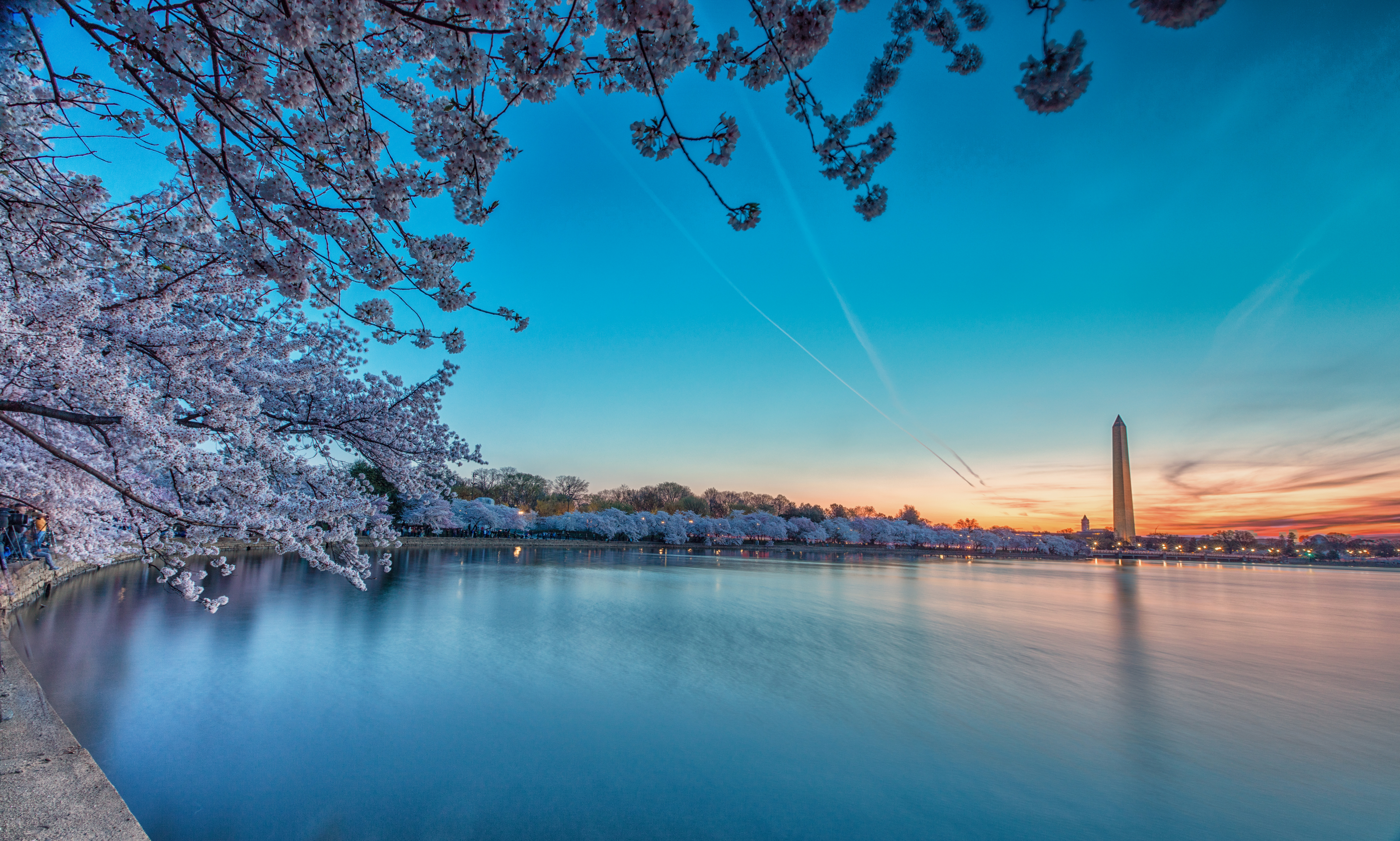
Cherry blossoms along the Tidal Basin.

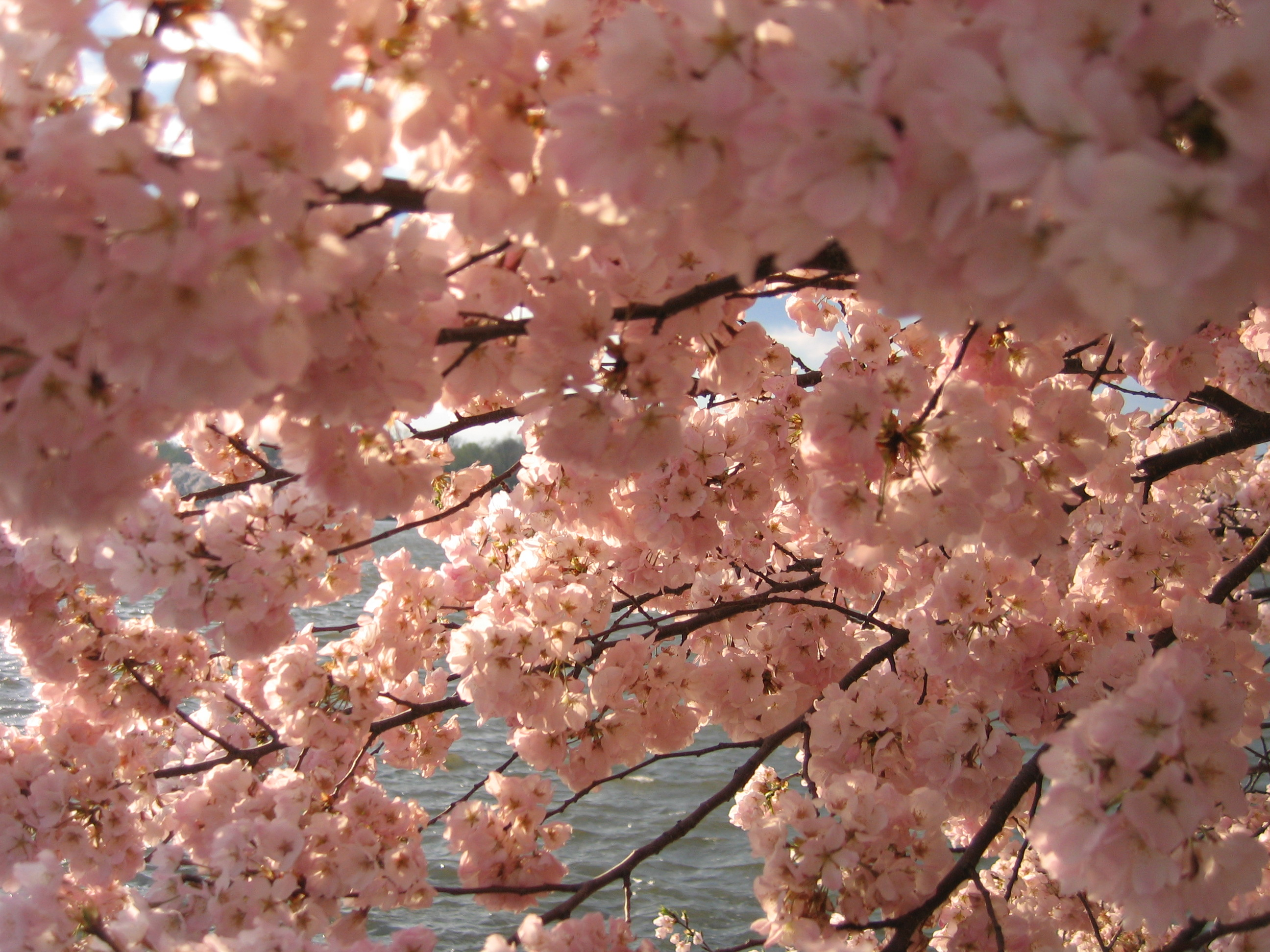
A detailed close-up of some cherry blossoms.

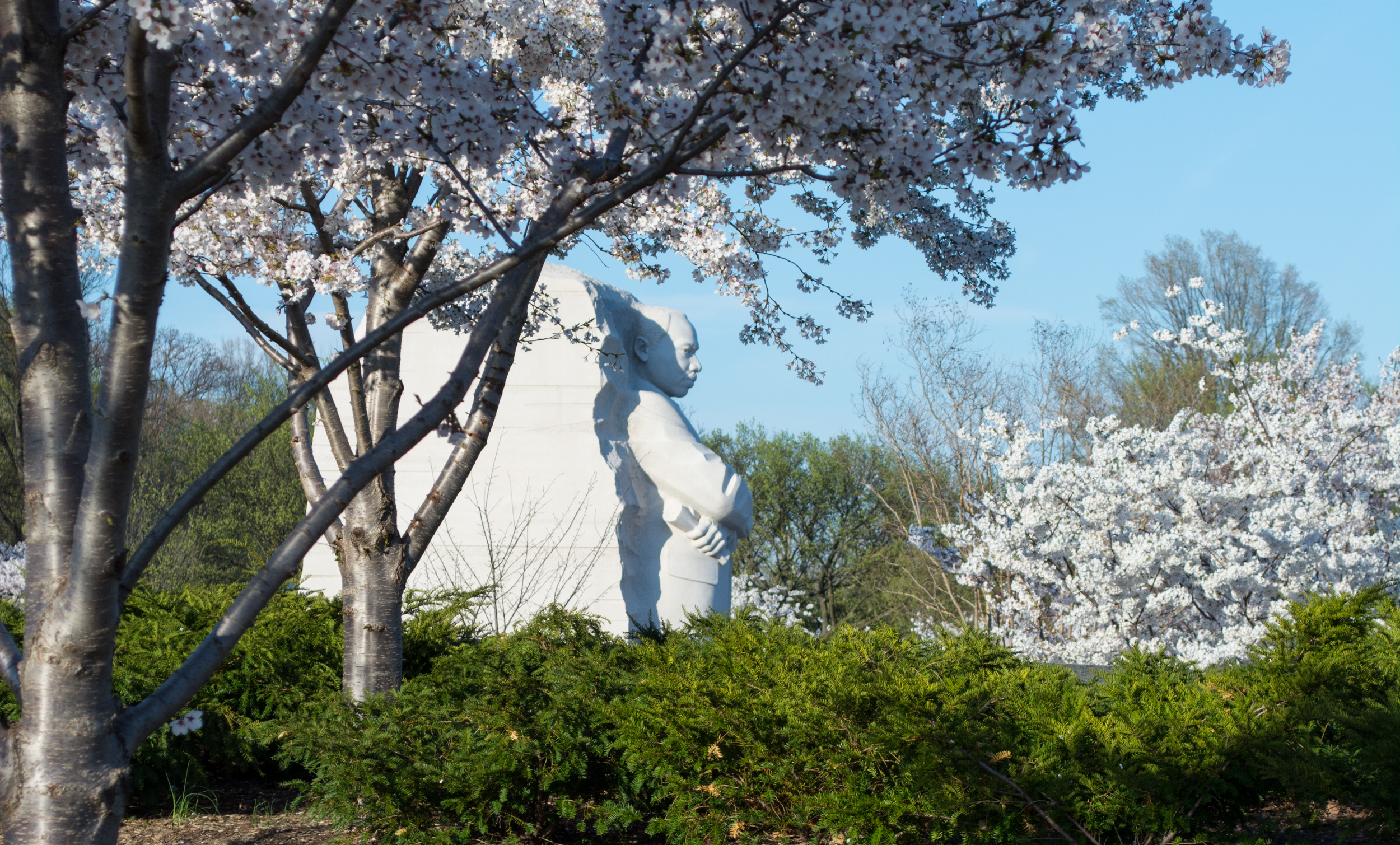
Cherry blossoms surrounding the MLK Memorial.

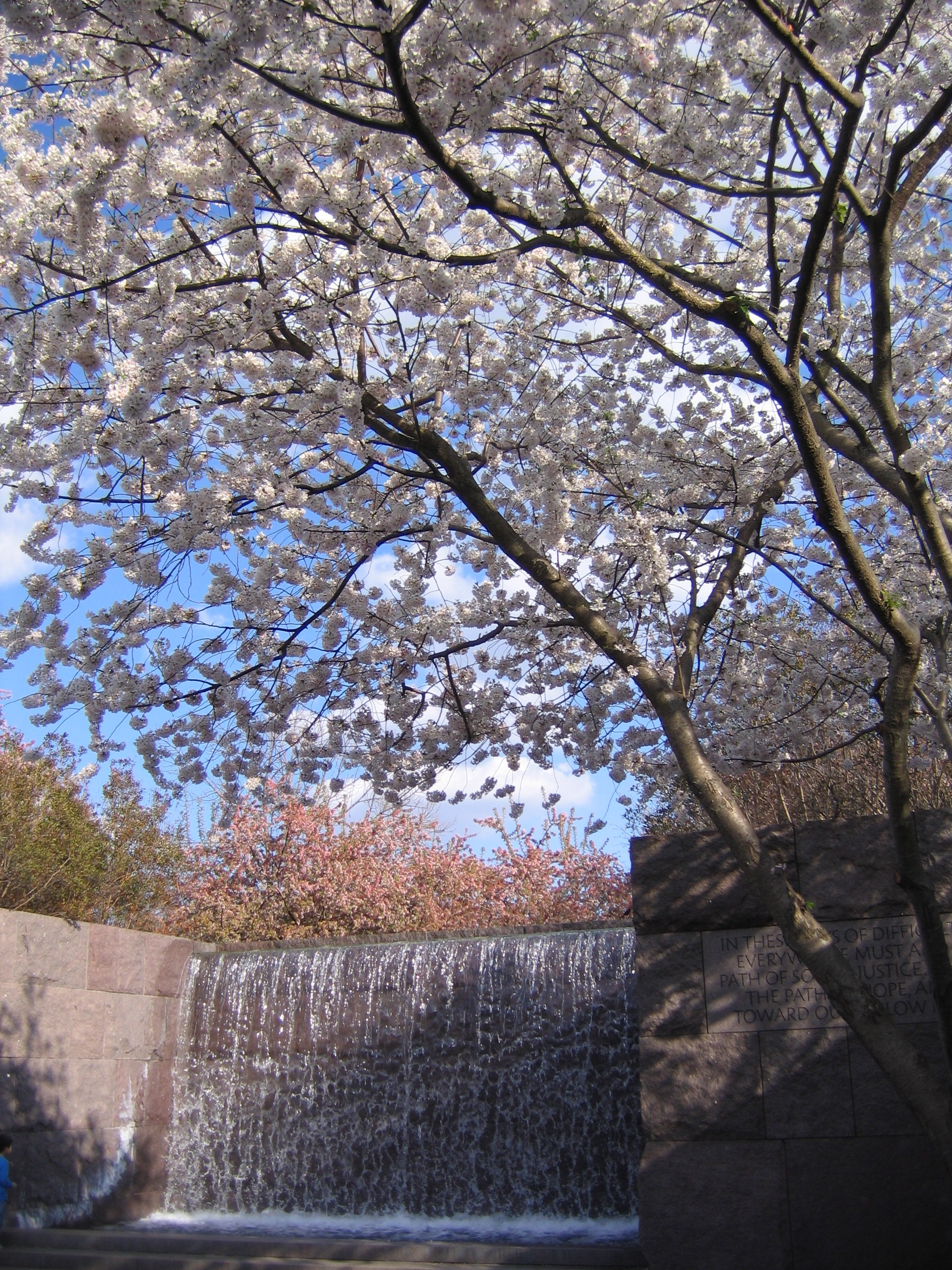
Blossoms at the FDR Memorial.

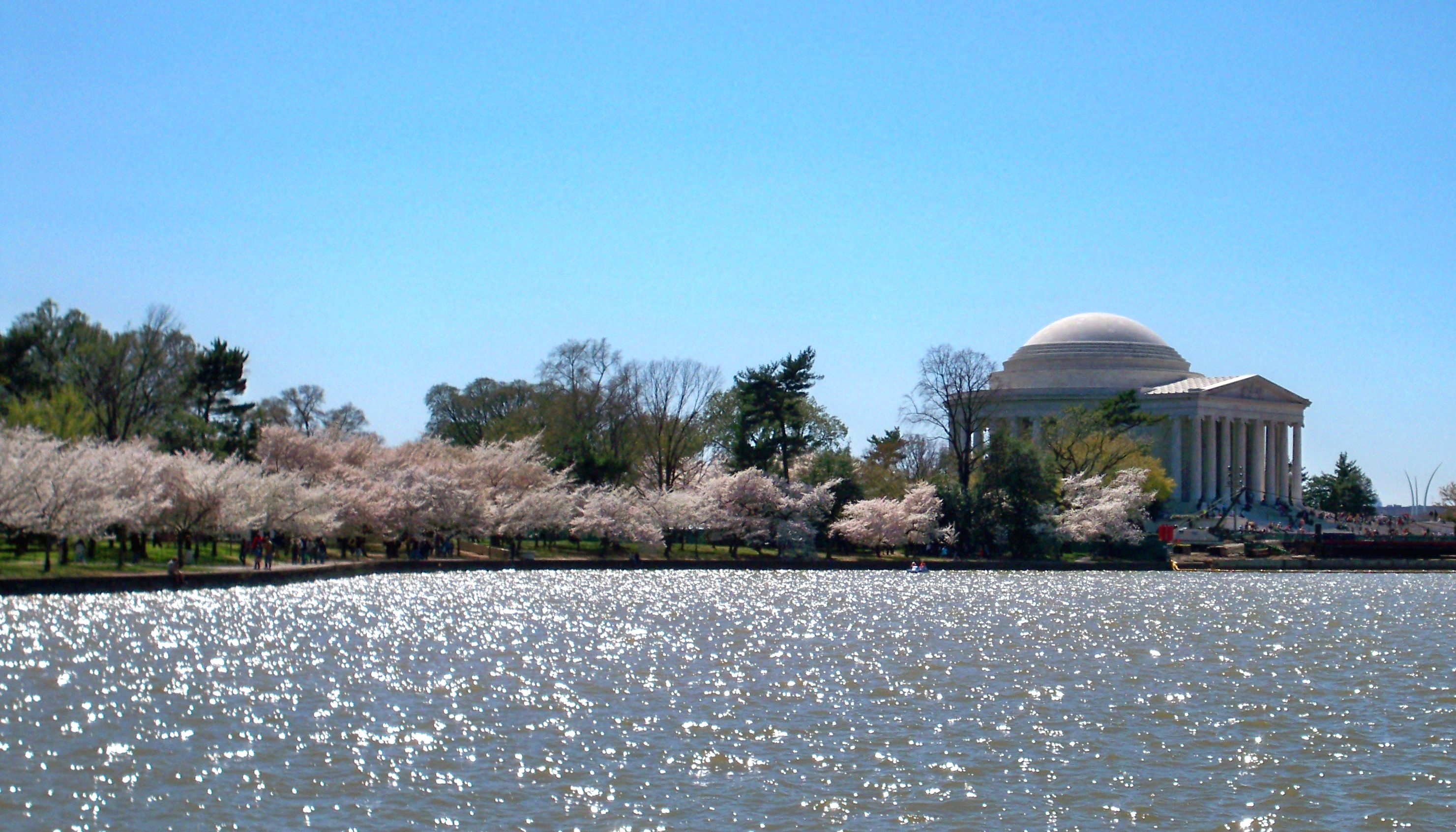
Wide view of the Tidal Basin with blossoms in 2010.

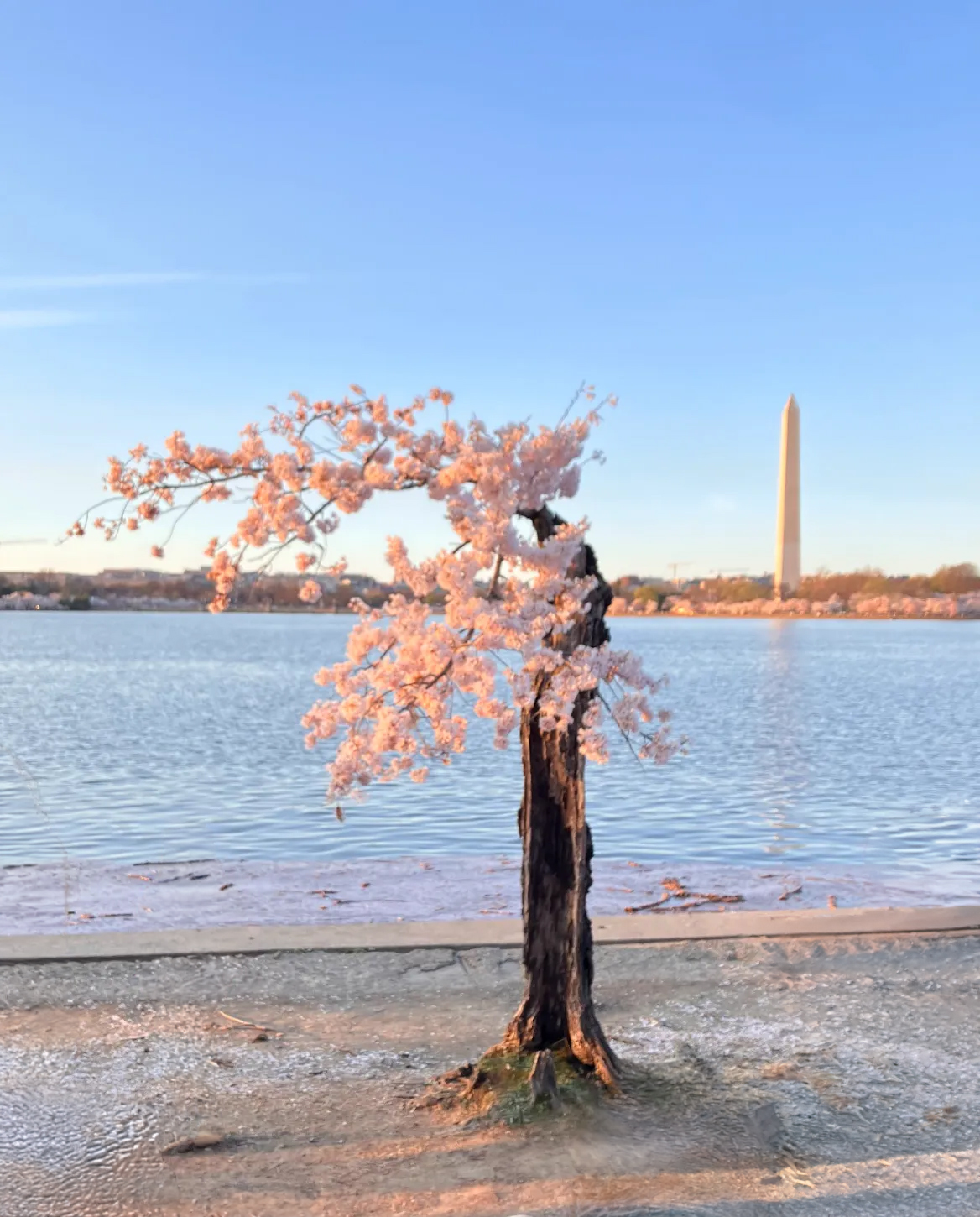
Stumpy, a small tree that went viral on the internet in 2020 and uprooted in 2024.

== See also ==
- Branch Brook Park, largest collection of cherry blossom trees in the United States
- Hanami, Cherry Blossom Viewing in Japanese
- International Cherry Blossom Festival, Macon, Georgia
- Canadian Tulip Festival, a festival commemorating a similar gift from the Dutch royal family in exile during World War II
