= Prunus takesimensis =

Conservation status
- Least Concern (IUCN 3.1)

Scientific classification
- Kingdom: Plantae
- Clade: Tracheophytes
- Clade: Angiosperms
- Clade: Eudicots
- Clade: Rosids
- Order: Rosales
- Family: Rosaceae
- Genus: Prunus
- Section: P. sect. Cerasus
- Species: P. takesimensis

Binomial name
- Prunus takesimensis Nakai

Species of tree

Prunus takesimensis (Korean: 섬벚나무, lit. 'island cherry') is a species of cherry endemic to Ulleung Island, South Korea. A tree reaching 20 m, it is used as an ornamental. Morphologically it most closely resembles Prunus sargentii but its chloroplast genome is most similar to Prunus serrulata var. spontanea (syn. Prunus jamasakura).

== Uses ==
As an ornamental flowering cherry, it has above average tolerance to flooding, possibly the best in the genus. Prunus takesimensis individuals make up about 5% of the famous cherries of Washington, DC.
