= Climate change in Washington, D.C. =

Climate change in Washington, D.C., is marked by rising temperatures, increased rainfall and flooding, and storm surges of the Potomac River. Tourism is affected by shifts in the cherry blossom bloom. The city's government is active in climate adaptation and mitigation efforts.

== Consequences ==
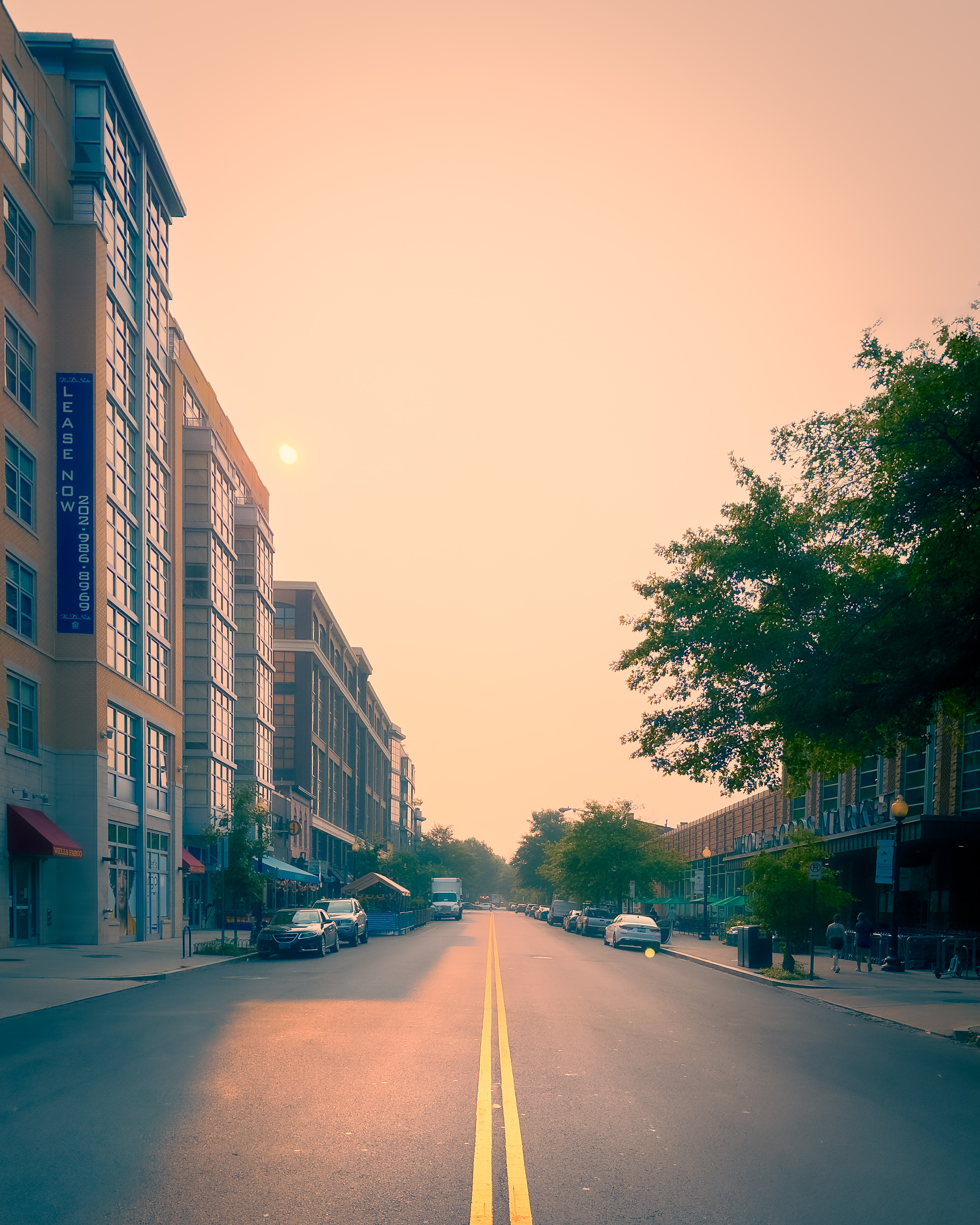
Wildfire smoke, 2023 wildfire season

=== Rising temperatures ===
By 2016, climate change had caused average temperatures in D.C. to rise 2 °F (1.1 °C) in a half-century, more than the nationwide average. Average summer temperatures have continued to rise: five out of six of the District's hottest recorded summers have occurred after 2010. By the 2080s, the average summer high temperature of the district is expected to increase from the historic high of 87 °F (31 °C) to between 93 °F (34 °C) and 97 °F (36 °C).

These rising temperatures hurt residents' health by raising the risk of heat-related illnesses, respiratory issues due to increased ozone, pollen, and ragweed counts, and increased disease spread by mosquitoes due to the higher biting rates and faster life cycles caused by rising temperatures.

Summers are 5 to 10% more humid in 2019 than they were in the 1970s, according the Washington Post. This results in up to a 5 °F (2.3 °C) increase in perceived temperature. Thus an 86 °F (30 °C) summer day, which felt like 89 °F (32 °C) in the 1970s, may now feel more like 91 °F (33 °C)–92 °F (33 °C) degrees.

=== Shifting rainfall ===
Rainfall is expected to increase during the winter and spring, but remain largely stagnant during fall and summer. This, when combined with increased temperatures drying soil, will increase flooding during winter and spring and increase drought during fall and summer.

=== Flooding and land subsidence ===
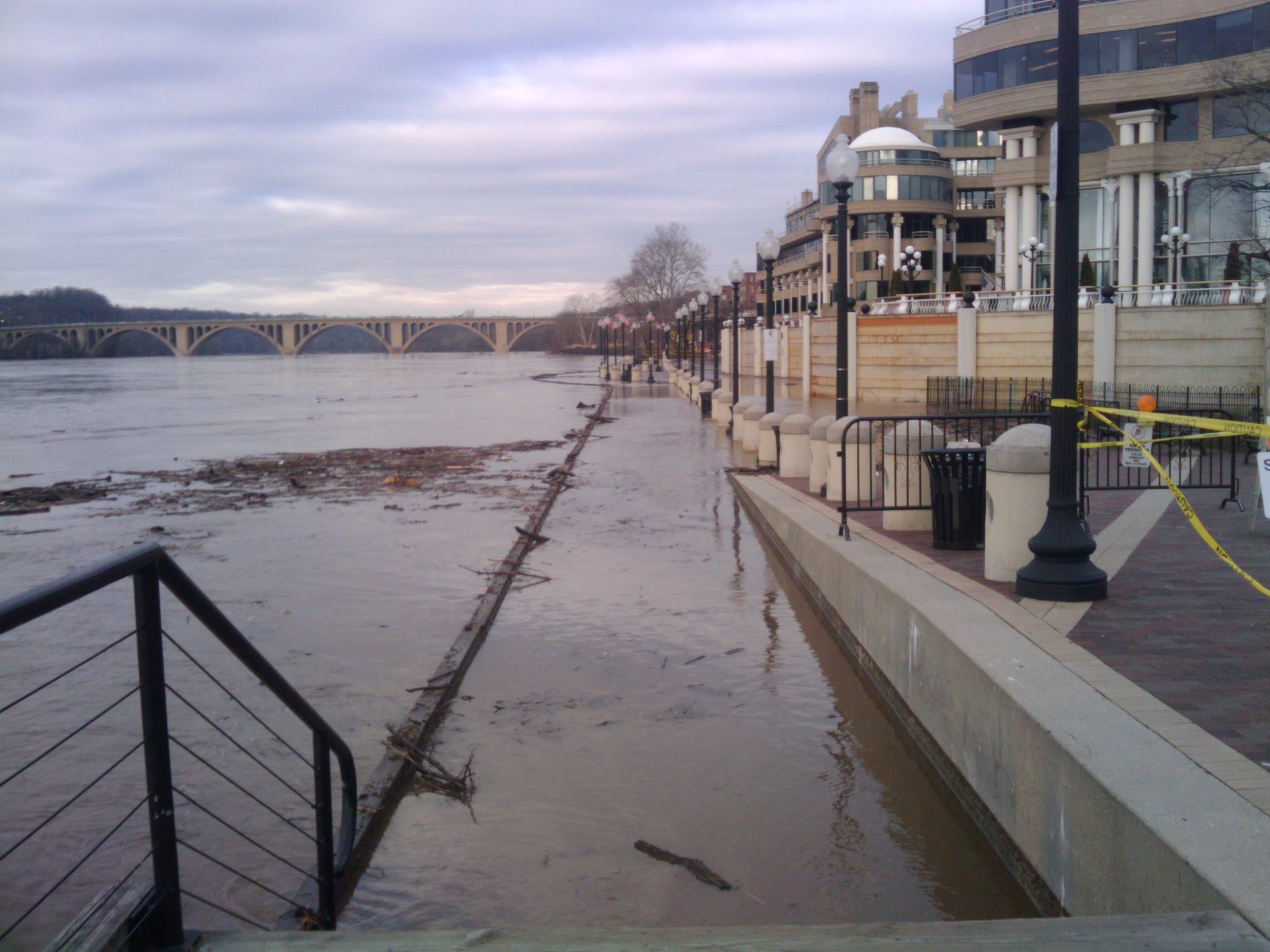
Flooding at Washington Harbour, 2010

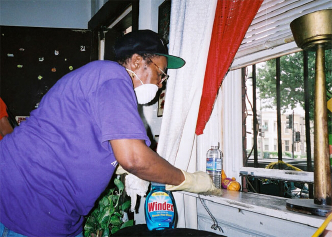
Home reconstruction following floods, 2001

By 2017, land subsidence had begun and nuisance flooding had become more common in the city's waterfront areas.

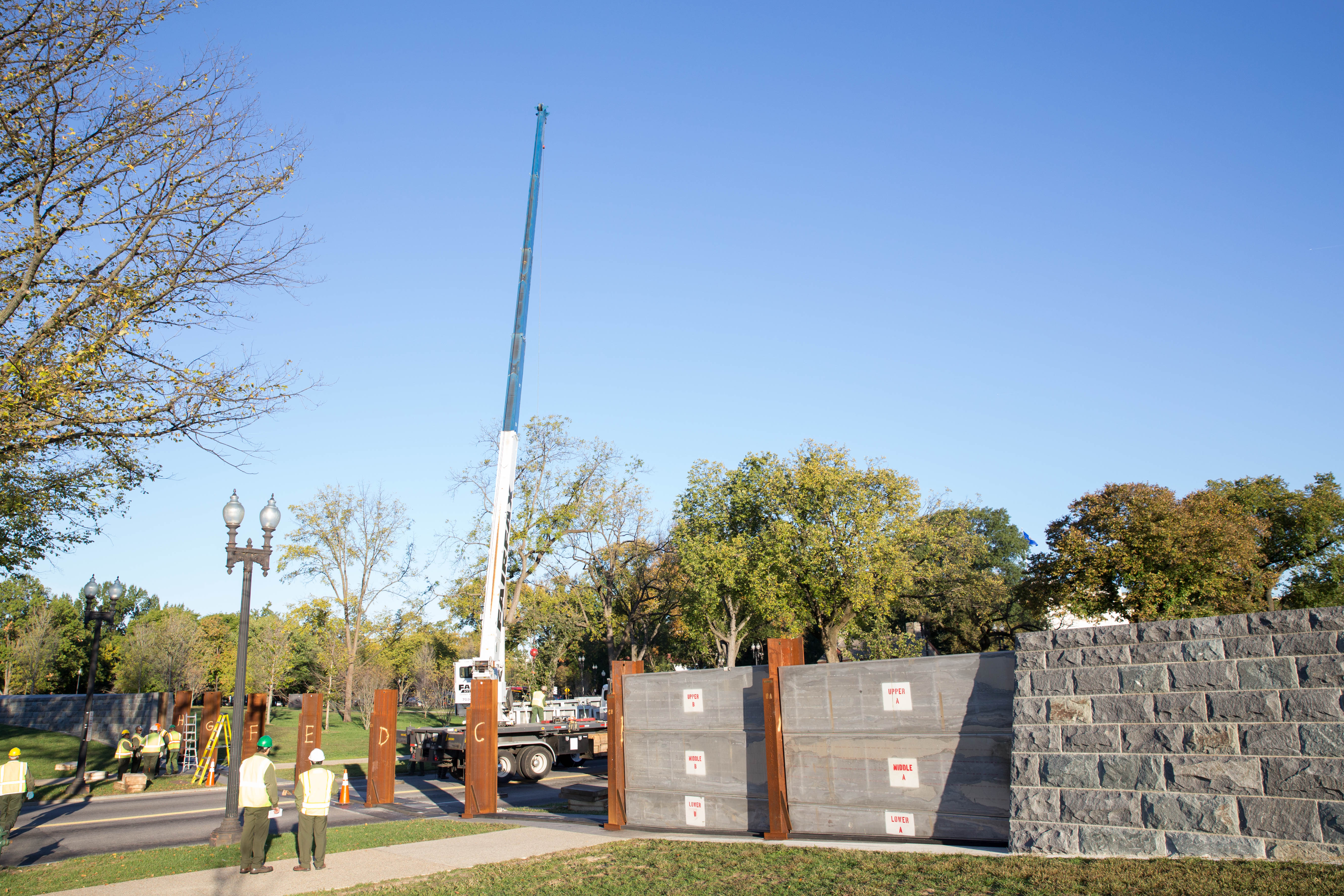
Levee construction drilling, 2016

=== Early blooming of cherry blossoms ===
Washington’s cherry trees are blooming earlier. From 1921 to 2017, peak bloom dates shifted earlier by about five days. The timing of the peak bloom is important to tourism and the local economy because the cherry blossoms draw more than one million people each year, many of whom are visitors.

== Climate change mitigation policies ==
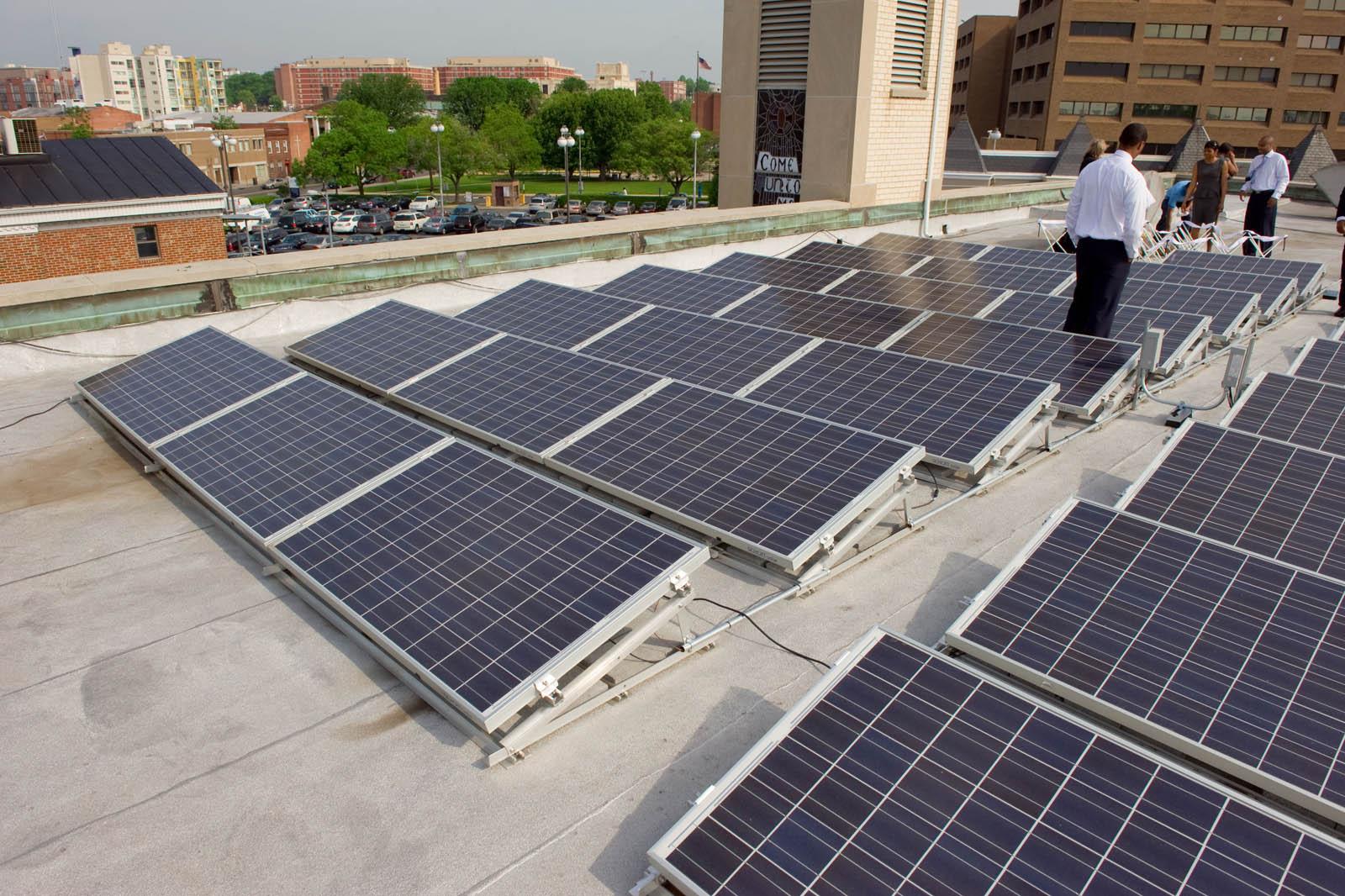
Rooftop solar installation

=== Gray Administration ===
Under Mayor Vincent Gray, the city began an effort known as the Sustainable DC. As part of this effort, Gray signed the Sustainable DC Act of 2012. This act had various sections dedicated to promoting energy efficiency, natural river conservation, renewable energy, ENERGY STAR ratings for buildings, Anacostia River cleanup, urban agriculture, and healthy air.

Alongside this act, the office released the Sustainable DC Plan. This plan was drafted in 2011 and released in February 2013, with the vow to make the city the "healthiest, greenest, and most livable city in the United States" by 2032. This plan was developed in cooperation with 4,700 people via 24 public events. The plan outlined the following priorities:

- Spending $500 million to make city buildings more energy efficient, requiring them to generate at least as much energy as they consume
- Increasing the cost of parking, and aiming to have a quarter of all commuter trips be by bike or foot and half by public transportation
- Reducing greenhouse-gas emissions and energy use by 50 percent by 2032
- Improving recycling and establishing municipal composting
- Spending $4.5 million to create 10 “mini” neighborhood parks out of existing parking spaces
- Proposing a ban on plastic foam food containers
- Creating swimmable and fishable Anacostia River

Gray left office after a single term, but several of these initiatives persisted after his time in office. The ban on styrofoam containers went into effect on January 1, 2016, "banning businesses and organizations that serve food or beverages from using disposable food service ware made of expanded polystyrene".

=== Bowser Administration ===
Mayor Muriel Bowser assumed office in January 2015, and appointed former DC Council member Tommy Wells director for the District Department of Energy & Environment (DOEE).

In 2016, DOEE and the Department of Employment Services (DOES) dcreated Solar Works DC, a program to train local workers to install residential solar panels on hundreds of homes of low-income residents.

In November 2016, the City of the District of Columbia published the Climate Ready DC Plan, a climate adaptation plan. In this report, the city committed to reducing greenhouse gas (GHG) emissions by 50% by 2032 and 80% by 2050.

In December 2017, at the North American Climate Summit, Mayor Bowser pledged to make D.C. carbon-neutral and climate-resilient by 2050. This commitment expanded the previous 80% reduction to 100% reduction. That same year, the city has also mandated 50% renewable energy by 2032.

Mayor Bowser also created a successor to the Sustainable DC Plan: Sustainable DC 2.0, released in August 2018 after 20 months of development that involved more than 4,000 people. This plan's focus areas include: Governance, Equity, Built Environment, Climate, Economy, Education, Energy, Food, Health, Nature, Transportation, Waste, and Water.

The Clean Energy DC Omnibus Amendment Act of 2018, effective March 2019, mandated that 100% of the District’s energy supply come from Tier 1 renewable energy sources by 2032. A 2022 report on the progress of this mandate indicates that the number of certified Community Renewable Energy Facilities (CREFs) grew from 12 in 2019 to 219 by the end of 2021.

The Climate Commitment Act of 2022, passed in 2022, codifies the District's commitment to the Paris Agreement, by mandating that the city neutralize GHG emissions by 2045, reach carbon neutrality in government operations by 2040, and end new purchases of fossil fuel-based heating equipment and vehicles by 2025 and 2026.

The Clean Energy DC Building Code Amendment Act of 2022 requires all new construction or substantial improvements of covered buildings to be constructed to a net-zero-energy standard, beginning on January 1, 2027.

As of April 2023, the Bowser administration was updating the 2018 Clean Energy DC Plan, calling the new report Clean Energy DC 2.0 (CEDC 2.0). The aim of the new plan is to reduce emissions by 56% in 2032 compared to 2006.

== See also ==
- Plug-in electric vehicles in Washington, D.C.
