= Stumpy (tree) =

Cherry tree in Washington, D.C.

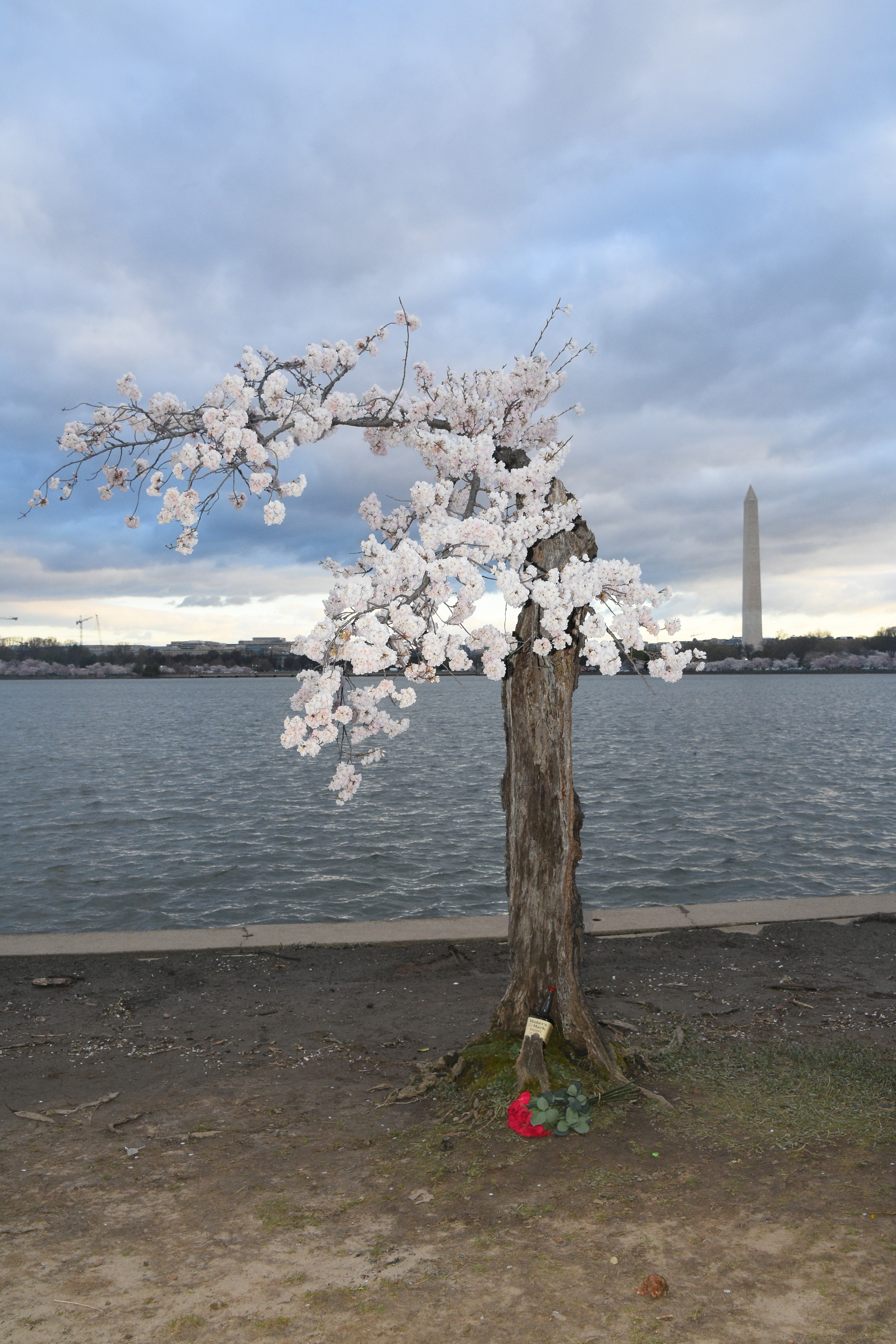
- Stumpy the cherry tree at low tide
- Species: Yoshino Cherry Tree (Prunus x yedoensis)
- Location: Washington, DC
- Date seeded: 1912 (est.)
- Date felled: May 24, 2024
- Custodian: National Park Service

Stumpy the Cherry Tree, often just called Stumpy, was a Yoshino cherry tree situated along the Tidal Basin in Washington, D.C. The tree became popular in the 21st century due to its battered appearance which was caused by repeated flooding of the basin.

The tree became waterlogged in the 20th century due to repeated tidal flooding caused by land subsidence and rising sea levels. The tree only had three to four flowering branches and a hollowed-out trunk by the time it became popular. Stumpy was removed on May 24, 2024 as part of a project to repair the basin's sea wall.

== History ==
=== 20th century: Planting and climate change ===
Stumpy is descended from the 3,020 trees gifted to the United States by Tokyo Mayor Yukio Ozaki in 1912 as a symbol of Japanese–American friendship.

The National Park Service estimates that Stumpy was planted in 1999; however, because its trunk is hollowed and has no tree rings, it's difficult to know exactly how old the tree is.

Climate change and the sinking of the Tidal Basin's sea wall contributed to the tree's demise. Overall, land has sunk by five feet while water levels had risen by one foot. This combination had led to the land around the basin flooding twice a day at high tide. In addition to being waterlogged, the tree is also victim to sun-scalding, overgrowth of fungi, and compacted soil.

=== 21st century: Rise to fame and removal ===
During the COVID-19 pandemic, a Reddit user posted a photo of the tree in the "r/washingtondc" subreddit and compared Stumpy's appearance to their love life. Social media posts and accompanying traditional media increased the tree's notoriety. Posts often focused on the ability of the tree to bloom despite its condition and harsh environment. Axios, a news media outlet, also compared the tree to Tiny Timber, an undersized Christmas tree in D.C.'s Columbia Heights Civic Plaza in 2022. After the tree's rise to fame, individuals had left flowers, art, gifts, and bottles of liquids at the base of the tree.

The tree had been described by National Park Service workers as a "folk hero", being the most asked-about tree along the Tidal Basin. Additionally, the tree had become anthropomorphized to the point that the public more often uses masculine pronouns than "it" when referring to the tree.

In early 2024, it was announced by the National Park Service that Stumpy would be one of 153 cherry trees removed as part of a $113 million project to repair the Tidal Basin's sea wall. By this time, Stumpy had become too brittle and hollowed out to be successfully transplanted to a different location. Instead, in April 2024, the National Park Service and National Arboretum took clippings of Stumpy to propagate new cherry trees that are genetically the same as Stumpy. These propagations have been referred to as "Stumpy 2.0" by media outlets. The tree was removed on Friday, May 24, 2024. In mid-August 2024, the National Arboretum announced that the clippings of Stumpy had been successfully cloned, with five viable clones.

In 2026, it was revealed that Stumpy had been ground into wood chips after its death, and that those chips had been integrated into the mulch being used to feed newly planted cherry trees around the Tidal Basin.

== In popular culture ==
- DC-based photographer and freelance Washington Post writer Kevin Ambrose released a Stumpy-themed calendar in 2024.
- Beginning in 2024, Stumpy was named the official mascot of the Credit Union Cherry Blossom 10-Mile and 5K runs.
- The National Bobblehead Hall of Fame and Museum released 2,025 limited-edition Stumpy bobbleheads in 2025.
- California author Karen McHenry wrote a children's book about Stumpy in 2024.
