= Phase-out of polystyrene foam =

Decline of polystyrene foam use

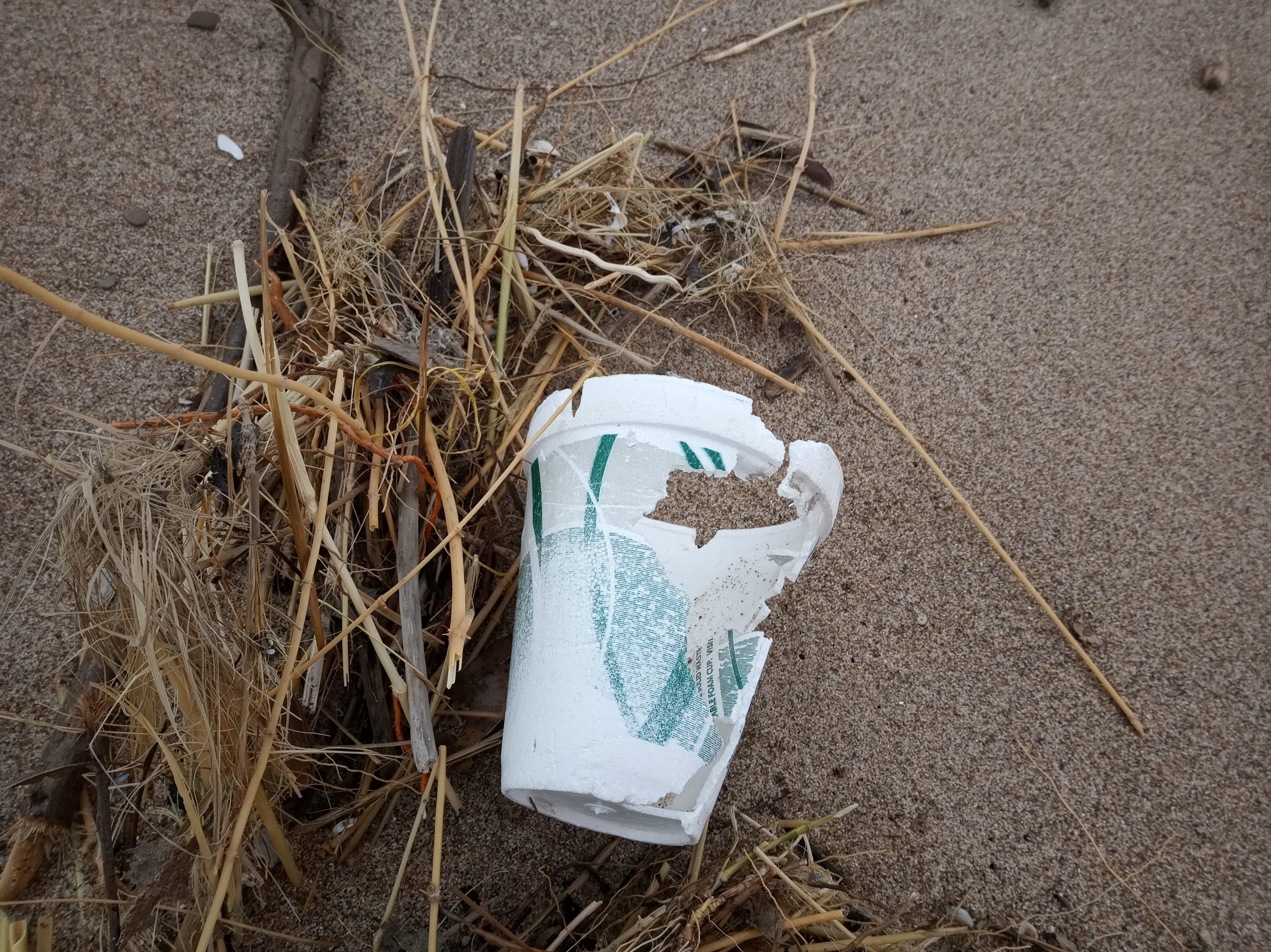
Discarded polystyrene cup on the shore of Lake Michigan

In the late 20th and early 21st century, there has been a global movement towards the phase-out of polystyrene as a single use plastic (SUP). Early bans of polystyrene foam foam intended to eliminate ozone-depleting chlorofluorocarbons (CFCs), formerly a major component.

Expanded polystyrene, often termed Styrofoam, is a contributor of microplastics from both land and maritime activities. Polystyrene is not biodegradeable but is susceptible to photo-oxidation, and degrades slowly in the ocean as microplastic marine debris. Animals do not recognize polystyrene foam as an artificial material, may mistake it for food, and show toxic effects after substantial exposure.

Full or partial bans of expanded and polystyrene foam commonly target disposable food packaging. Such bans have been enacted through national legislation globally, and also at sub-national or local levels in many countries.

== Legislation around the world ==
=== National legislation ===
China banned expanded polystyrene takeout/takeaway containers and tableware in 1999, but later revoked the policy in 2013 amidst industry lobbying. Haiti banned foam food containers in 2012 to reduce waste in canals and roadside drains. In 2019, the European Parliament voted 560 to 35 to ban all food and beverage containers made from expanded polystyrene throughout the European Union member states. Canada amended its 'Canadian Environmental Protection Act, 1999' in 2022 to prohibit foodservice ware made of expanded or extruded polystyrene, and also polyvinyl chloride, black colored plastics, or oxo-degraded plastics.

=== Summary ===
Phase out of polystyrene foam around the world (laws passed but not yet in effect are not shown on map): Polystyrene foam banned Partial ban

Country	Legislation	Year	Ref.
Andorra	Ban	2023	
Antigua and Barbuda	Ban	2017–2019	
Armenia	Ban	2027	
Austria (EU)	Ban	2021	
Bahamas	Ban	2020	
Barbados	Ban	2020	
Belgium (EU)	Ban	2021	
Belize	Ban	2019	
Bulgaria (EU)	Ban	2021	
Cabo Verde	Ban	2024	
Canada	Ban	2023	
Chile	Ban	2022	
Colombia	Ban	2030	
Costa Rica	Ban	2021	
Croatia (EU)	Ban	2021	
Cyprus (EU)	Ban	2021	
Czech Republic (EU)	Ban	2021	
Denmark (EU)	Ban	2021	
Dominica	Ban	2018	
Dominican Republic	Ban	2026	
Ecuador	Ban	2022	
Estonia (EU)	Ban	2021	
Fiji	Ban	2021	
Finland (EU)	Ban	2021	
France (EU)	Ban	2021	
Georgia	Ban	2026	
Germany (EU)	Ban	2021	
Ghana	Ban	2027	
Greece (EU)	Ban	2021	
Grenada	Ban	2018	
Guyana	Ban	2016	
Haiti	Ban	2012	
Hong Kong	Ban	2024	
Hungary (EU)	Ban	2021	
Iceland	Ban	2021	
India	Ban	2022	
Ireland (EU)	Ban	2021	
Italy (EU)	Ban	2021	
Jamaica	Ban	2020	
Latvia (EU)	Ban	2021	
Liechtenstein	Ban	2021	
Lithuania (EU)	Ban	2021	
Luxembourg (EU)	Ban	2021	
Macau	Ban	2021	
Maldives	Ban	2022	
Malta (EU)	Ban	2021	
Marshall Islands	Ban	2017	
Mauritius	Ban	2021	
Micronesia	Ban	2020	
Moldova	Ban	2021	
Monaco	Ban	2021	
Montenegro	Ban	2024	
Netherlands (EU): Constituent Countries; Aruba; Special Municipalities; Bonaire; Saba; Sint Eustatius	Ban	2021 (NL): 2019 (AW); 2022 (BO); 2022 (SA); 2021 (SE)	
New Zealand: Associated States; Niue	Ban	2022 (NZ): 2018 (NU)	
Norway	Ban	2021	
Peru	Ban	2021	
Poland (EU)	Ban	2021	
Portugal (EU)	Ban	2021	
Romania (EU)	Ban	2021	
Rwanda	Ban	2019	
Saint Kitts and Nevis	Ban	2024	
Saint Lucia	Ban	2019	
Saint Vincent and the Grenadines	Ban	2017	
Samoa	Ban	2021	
San Marino	Ban	2021	
Seychelles	Ban	2017	
Slovakia (EU)	Ban	2021	
Slovenia (EU)	Ban	2021	
Solomon Islands	Ban	2024	
Spain (EU)	Ban	2021	
Sri Lanka	Ban	2021	
Suriname	Ban	2019	
Sweden (EU)	Ban	2021	
Taiwan	Ban	2022	
Timor-Leste	Ban	2021	
Trinidad and Tobago	Ban	2019	
Tuvalu	Ban	2019	
United Arab Emirates	Ban	2026	
United Kingdom: Great Britain and Northern Ireland; England; Northern Ireland; Scotland; Wales; Isle of Man; Overseas Territories; Anguilla; Gibraltar; Turks and Caicos Islands	Ban	2023 (ENG); 2021 (NIR) (Note: As required per the Northern Ireland Protocol); 2022 (SCT); 2023 (WLS); 2023 (IM); 2019 (AI); 2019 (GI); 2019 (TC)	
Vanuatu	Ban	2018	
Zimbabwe	Ban	2017	

=== Subnational legislation ===
In Australia, over 97% of the population live in an area that bans expanded polystyrene. Between 2021-2023, the Australian Capital Territory, New South Wales, Queensland, South Australia, Victoria, and Western Australia enacted bans.

Nigeria's states of Lagos and Abia introduced bans in January 2024, with an initial transition period of three weeks. The state of Oyo introduced a ban in March 2024.

Municipal bans in the Philippines are in effect in Bailen, Boracay, Caloocan, Cordova, El Nido, Las Piñas, Makati, Mandaluyong City, Muntinlupa, Quezon City, and Tacloban.

In the United Arab Emirates, the municipal government of Dubai announced a ban affecting polystyrene in 2025, and all single-use plastic food containers in 2026. The national government enacted a ban in 2026.

== Phaseout in the United States ==
Polystyrene foam legislation in the United States: Polystyrene foam banned Local bans on polystyrene No legal restrictions

As of June 2026, 12 U.S. states, the District of Columbia, and two territories have passed statewide legislation to explicitly ban polystyrene foam:

- In 2019, Maryland was the first state to enact a ban, which went into effect on 1 October 2020. Bans were also passed that year in Maine and Vermont, with both states' laws taking effect on 1 July 2021.
- In 2020, New York passed a ban that took effect on 1 January 2022, while New Jersey passed a ban that took effect on 4 May 2022.
- In 2021, Colorado passed a ban that took effect on 1 January 2024. Virginia passed a ban on polystyrene food containers coming into force in July 2025 (for larger businesses) and July 2026 (for businesses with less than 20 locations). Washington also passed a polystyrene ban, effective starting in June 2023, with food serviceware prohibited starting 1 June 2024.
- In 2023, Delaware, Oregon and Rhode Island all signed bans into law. Provisions in Oregon and Rhode Island took effect on 1 January 2025, with Delaware's statute entering into force in July 2025.
- In 2025, California de jure banned polystyrene as a result of the state's legislature passing the Plastic Pollution Prevention and Packaging Producer Responsibility Act (SB54) in June 2022. The law codifies extended producer responsibility (EPR) requirements for plastics, including a requirement that polystyrene be banned if recycling rates do not reach 25% by 2025. Recycling rates averaged 6% at passage, leading some to call the law a 'de facto ban', anticipating an inability to comply. As a result, producers were restricted from selling, offering for sale, distributing, or importing EPS food service ware in or into California after January 1, 2025. CalRecycle, the state's recycling and waste management agency, implemented relevant regulations on May 1, 2026.
- Washington, D.C. banned polystyrene foam takeout containers on 1 January 2016. The ban was expanded on 1 January 2021, to include the retail sale of polystyrene foam.
- American Samoa banned the import, sale, and distribution of polystyrene foam containers on 6 February 2024, taking effect 60 days later.
- Puerto Rico banned the use, wholesale, or retail sale of polystyrene foam containers after enacting Law No. 51 of 29 June 2022. Later amendments delayed the operative date of the law from 2024 to 1 January 2027.

In Hawaii, a de facto ban is in effect after every county enacted polystyrene bans except state-administered Kalawao County. Bans in Hawaii County took effect July 2019, followed by Kauaʻi County, Maui County, and Honolulu County in 2022. Maui separately banned polystyrene foam coolers, and the sale or rental of disposable bodyboards in 2022.

=== Local legislation ===
Local bans have been enacted elsewhere, including in many large and small cities within the US:

- Alaska — In Alaska, the towns of Bethel, Cordova, and Seward have enacted bans.
- California — Prior to implementation of statewide prohibitions under SB54, at least 128 cities in California had an existing polystyrene ban in some form, some with stricter provisions than state requirements. 12 counties — namely Alameda, Contra Costa, Los Angeles, Marin, Mendocino, Monterey, San Francisco, San Luis Obispo, San Mateo, Santa Clara, Santa Cruz, and Sonoma have bans affecting the general public. Additionally, 28 municipalities in other counties, namely Arcata, Camarillo, Carlsbad, Carpinteria, Dana Point, Davis, Del Mar, Encinitas, Goleta, Imperial Beach, Laguna Beach, Nevada City, Newport Beach, Oceanside, Ojai, Oxnard, Palm Springs, Port Hueneme, San Clemente, San Diego, Santa Barbara, Solana Beach, South Lake Tahoe, Thousand Oaks, Truckee, Ventura, Vista, and Yountville have bans. Together these laws cover over 20.6 million people, or about 53% of the state's population. The city of Berkeley passed the nation's first polystyrene foodware ban in 1988, while also requiring all disposable foodware to be degradable or recyclable.
- Connecticut — Hamden, Groton, Norwalk, Stamford, and Westport have all enacted bans. Hamden enacted the state's first ban in 1989, and continues to retain its original ordinance.
- Georgia — Atlanta banned polystyrene at city-owned buildings, including Hartsfield–Jackson Atlanta International Airport. The city of South Fulton also banned single-use plastic containers by city departments in 2019, and the city of Clarkston passed a similar resolution in 2021.
- Illinois — Oak Park and River Forest have enacted bans. In 2023, the state legislature passed a ban affecting state agencies and universities.
- Massachusetts — At least 71 municipalities have bans on polystyrene, including Abington, Acton, Amherst, Andover, Arlington, Athol, Attleboro, Brookline, Buckland, Cambridge, Chatham, Chelmsford, Concord, Danvers, Dennis, Eastham, Easthampton, Essex, Fairhaven, Falmouth, Georgetown, Gloucester, Grafton, Great Barrington, Greenfield, Hadley, Hamilton, Hanson, Hudson, Ipswich, Lee, Lenox, Lexington, Lincoln, Manchester-by-the-Sea, Marblehead, Maynard, Medford, Melrose, Monson, Nantucket, Needham, Newton, Northborough, Northampton, Orleans, Pittsfield, Plymouth, Provincetown, Raynham, Reading, Revere, Rockport, Salem, Saugus, Shrewsbury, Somerville, South Hadley, Stockbridge, Sudbury, Swampscott, Upton, Wayland, Wellfleet, Westborough, Westfield, Westford, Whitman, Williamstown, Winthrop, and Yarmouth.
- Minnesota — Minneapolis enacted a ban in 1989, and amended the largely unenforced ban in 2015. In 2017, the city of St. Louis Park effectively banned single-use polystyrene after mandating reusable, compostable, or locally recyclable packaging. Similar bans were later implemented by the cities of Edina, Roseville, and Saint Paul. In 2009, the Leech Lake Band of Ojibwe tribal nation passed a resolution seeking to eliminate the use of Styrofoam.
- New Hampshire — Portsmouth enacted the first ban in New Hampshire in 2020.
- New Mexico — Santa Fe and Bernalillo Counties passed bans affecting unincorporated parts of their respective counties. The town of Taos also enacted a ban.
- Pennsylvania — The Boroughs of Ambler, Narberth, Newtown, Phoenixville, Swarthmore, West Conshohocken, and Townships of Abington, East Fallowfield, Montgomery, Newtown, Solebury, Tredyffrin, Upper Merion, Upper Moreland, Uwchlan, West Goshen, West Vincent, and Whitpain enacted bans.
- South Carolina — The city of Charleston adopted an ordinance in 2018, with the surrounding Charleston County adopting a similar ordinance the year after. Municipal bans on polystyrene were also passed in Arcadia Lakes, Edisto Beach, Folly Beach, Isle of Palms, James Island, Kiawah Island, Mount Pleasant, Seabrook Island, and Sullivan's Island. Beaufort County also passed a in 2026.

=== Proposed legislation ===
As of July 2026, proposed legislation banning polystyrene previously passed at least one legislative chamber in five states and one territory.

Inactive Legislation

In Alaska, HB 25 passed in the state House by a vote of 25-15, and the state Senate by a vote of 13-7 in 2026. Governor Mike Dunleavy vetoed the bill on July 3, 2026, preventing it from taking effect. Had it been enacted, the law would take effect on January 1, 2027.

In Connecticut, SB 118 passed the state Senate in April 2022, but died when the session ended.

In Illinois, the state Senate passed SB 1531 on 30 April 2025, which would prohibit the use of disposable food service containers starting in 2030. The bill failed to receive a vote in the state House, and died when the 2025 session ended. The bill expands on previously-enacted legislation affecting public agencies and universities. The Illinois state House previously passed HB2376 on 21 March 2023, which died when the session ended.

In Montana, the state legislature passed HB 477 in March 2025, after approval in the state House by a vote of 56-41, and the state Senate by a vote of 26-22. On 1 May 2025, Governor Greg Gianforte vetoed the bill, preventing the law's passage. Bozeman citizens separately passed a polystyrene ban through a citizen initiative in November 2024 by a vote of 63%, after supporters of the ballot initiative prevailed in a District Court lawsuit regarding HB407, a state law preempting local single-use plastic bans. A Montana Supreme Court ruling in December 2024 overturned the initial District Court ruling, finding that preemptive laws apply to local ordinances, whether passed by municipal governments or citizen initiatives. A separate District Court lawsuit remains pending, whether local governments have authority to uphold 'clean and healthful environments' as stated in the Montana State Constitution. If enacted, Bozeman's ordinance would have taken effect on 1 May 2025.

In Nevada, Assembly Bill 244 passed the state Assembly on 17 April 2025, and the state Senate on 21 May 2025. The bill was later vetoed by Governor Joe Lombardo the day before the legislative session ended. Had it been enacted, retailers with 10 or more locations in Nevada would be prohibited from using disposable polystyrene foodware starting 1 July 2025, expanding to all retail locations by 1 January 2029.

The territory of the Northern Mariana Islands passed HB21-89 in its House of Representatives in 2020.

In Arkansas, the city of Fayetteville passed a ban on single-use expanded polystyrene foam in May 2019. The state legislature passed HB1704 in April 2021, preempting all municipal bans in Arkansas, nullifying Fayetteville's enacted ban.

State / Territory	Year enacted	Year implemented	Details	Ref.
American Samoa	2024	2024	Covers all polystyrene foam containers. Affected products unsold six months after the law's implementation may be subject to confiscation.	A.S.C.A. § 25.23
California	2022	2025	Covers the selling, offering for sale, distributing, or importing of all expanded polystyrene trays, plates, bowls, clamshells, lids, cups, utensils, stirrers, hinged or lidded containers, and straws. De jure enactment began in January 2025.	Cal. Pub. Res. Code §§ 42040–42084 (2022)
Colorado	2021	2024	Covers ready-to-eat food containers (including hinged containers, plates, bowls, cups, trays) from retail food establishments.	CRS 25-17-506
Delaware	2023	2025	Covers food service packaging (including hinged or lidded containers, plates, cups, bowls, trays) from food establishments including restaurants, grocery stores, and ice manufacturers. Excludes containers, including coolers and ice chests, when used for raw meat, seafood, eggs, fruits, or vegetables. Takes effect on 1 July 2025.	16 Del. C. § 3001Q
District of Columbia	2014	2016	Covers food service products (including containers, plates, hot/cold cups) from food service businesses, including restaurants, cafes, grocery stores, food trucks, and cafeterias. Includes meat/vegetable trays, egg cartons, and other polystyrene items used to sell or provide food. Ban expanded in 2021 to include sale of packing peanuts and foam coolers.	D.C. Reg. § 21-2301 & D.C.ACT23-223
Maine	2019	2021	Includes food containers from retail food and eating establishments, factories, farmers' markets, and retirement/nursing homes. Covers items packed outside Maine, but shipped to the state. Polystyrene raw meat/seafood trays and egg cartons banned starting 2025. Foam coolers for seafood exempt.	38 M.R.S.A. § 15-A
Maryland	2019	2020	No person may sell, and no business/school may sell or serve polystyrene food containers (containers, plates, hot/cold cups, trays). Includes egg cartons (except if shipped empty into Maryland to pack eggs, or if eggs are packed in the state for Maryland consumers). Excludes containers for raw meat/seafood, nonfoam polystyrene, or food prepackaged in polystyrene foam.	Md. Code Ann., Env. § 9-2201 to 9–2207
New Jersey	2020	2022	Includes food containers and serviceware (containers, plates, hot/cold cups, trays, cutlery). Includes foam egg cartons. Containers for raw meat/seafood, cups 2oz or less, long-handled polystyrene spoons, and food prepackaged in polystyrene foam banned starting 2024.	Title 13:1E-99.126 et al.
New York	2020	2022	Includes food containers and serviceware (clamshell, bowl, carton, lid, plate, trays) from any food service provider, retail food store, deli, grocer, hospital, adult care/nursing home, or school. Includes packing peanuts/loose fill, sold by any manufacturer or store. Excludes containers for raw meat/seafood, food prepackaged in polystyrene foam, and rigid polystyrene.	N.Y. Consol. Laws § 30-43-B, Art. 27, Tit. 30 (2020)
Oregon	2023	2025	Prohibits the sale, offer for sale, distribution, or use of single-use polystyrene coolers, packing peanuts, or containers for serving prepared food. Excludes use for raw egg, meat, fish, or produce. Provisions took effect starting 1 January 2025.	ORS § 36A.459
Puerto Rico	2022	2027	Prohibits the use, wholesale, or retail sale of single-use expanded polystyrene for prepared and unprepared food. Provisions take effect starting 1 January 2027.	Act 51-2022 & Act 47-2025
Rhode Island	2023	2025	Prohibits the use of disposable polystyrene serviceware for prepared food, such as containers, cups, lids, or stirrers. Excludes coolers or ice chests. Provisions took effect starting 1 January 2025.	R.I. Gen. Laws § 21–27.3-2
Vermont	2019	2021	Includes food containers (plates, trays, hot/cold cups), and foam egg cartons. Excludes containers for raw meat/seafood, food prepackaged in polystyrene foam, and food packaged outside Vermont.	10 V.S.A. § 6696
Virginia	2021	2025	Includes any food containers for retail food establishments. Originally set to take effect in 2023/2025, implementation was delayed to 2028/2030 in 2022, and moved forward to 2025/2026 in 2024.	Va. Code Ann. § 10.1–1424.3 (&) 2022 HB30, Item 377#1c
Washington	2021	2023	Sale of packing peanuts/void fill banned starting June 2023. Beginning June 2024, includes any food containers (plates, bowls, trays, clamshell containers, hot/cold cups) and portable foam coolers. Excludes containers for raw meat/seafood, eggs, and produce. Excludes coolers for drugs or federally defined medical/biological materials, or for shipping perishables from a wholesale retail establishment.	RCW 70A.245.070

== See also ==
- Disposable food packaging bans and charges
- Plastic bag ban
- Polystyrene
- Styrofoam
