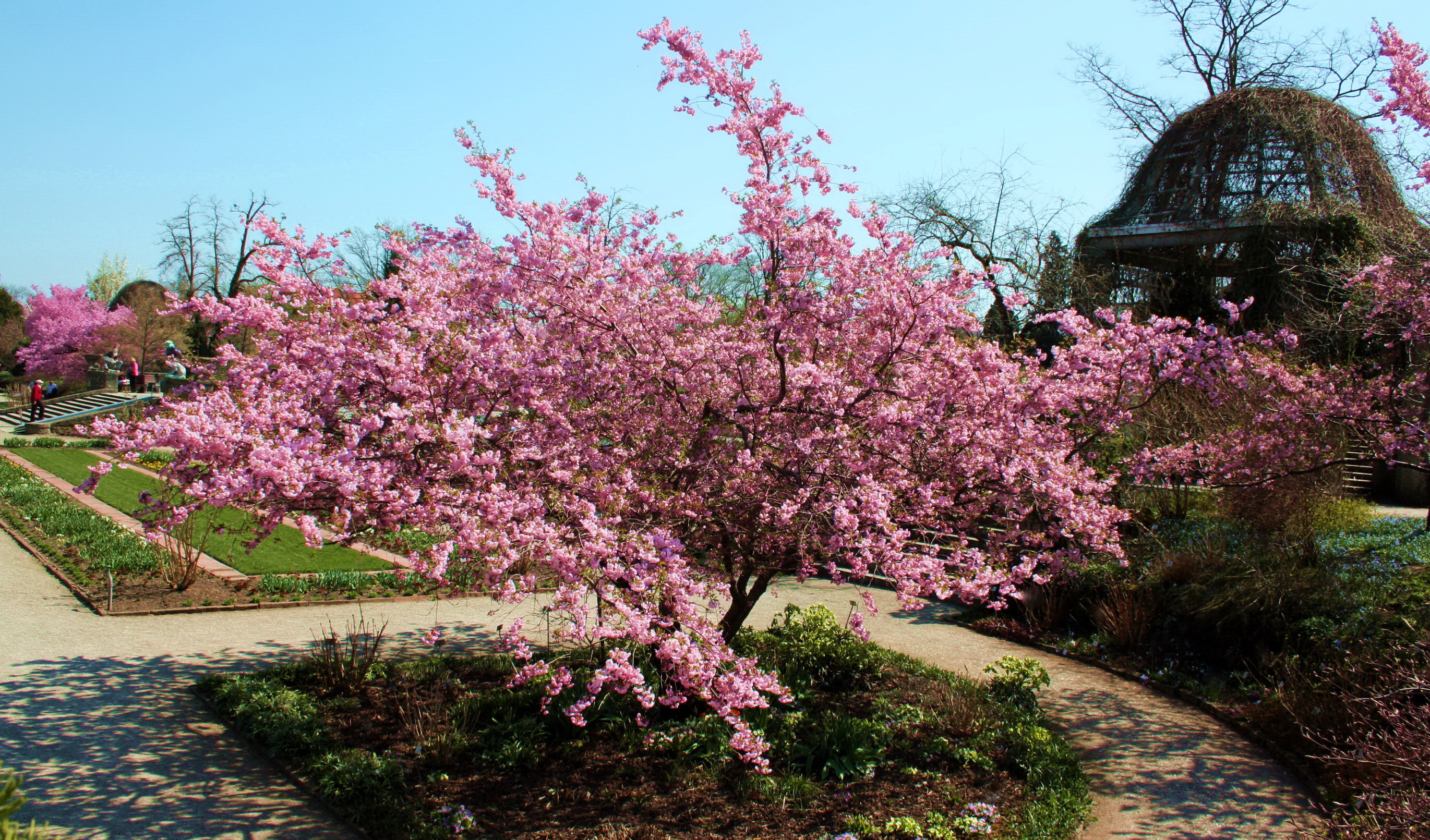

Conservation status
- Least Concern (IUCN 3.1)

Scientific classification
- Kingdom: Plantae
- Clade: Tracheophytes
- Clade: Angiosperms
- Clade: Eudicots
- Clade: Rosids
- Order: Rosales
- Family: Rosaceae
- Genus: Prunus
- Subgenus: Prunus subg. Cerasus
- Species: P. sargentii

Binomial name
- Prunus sargentii Rehder

Synonyms
- Prunus densifolia Koehne; Prunus floribunda Koehne; Prunus sachalinensis (F.Schmidt) Miyoshi; Prunus serrulata var. sachalinensis (F.Schmidt) E.H.Wilson

= Prunus sargentii =

Species of tree

Prunus sargentii, commonly known as Sargent's cherry or North Japanese hill cherry, is a species of cherry native to Japan, Korea, Sakhalin (Russia), and China.

The tree was named for Charles Sprague Sargent.

== Description ==
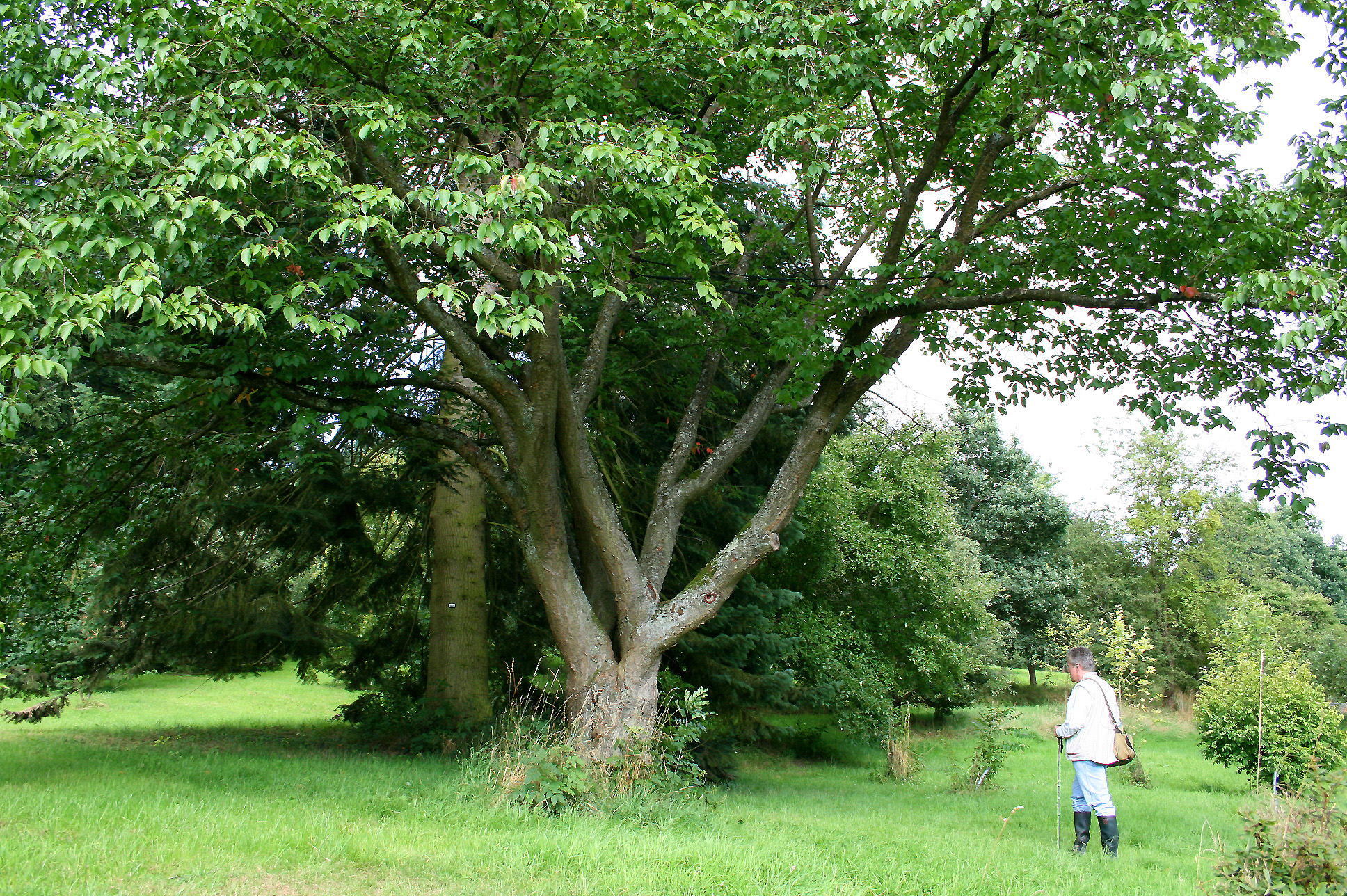
Tree in Rendeux (Belgium).

Prunus sargentii is a deciduous tree that grows 20–40 ft (6.1–12.2 m) tall and broad. New growth is a reddish or bronze color, changing to shiny dark green. The obovate leaves with serrated margins are 3–5 inches (7.6–12.7 cm) in length and are arranged alternately. In fall, the leaves turn red, orange, or yellow. It grows single pink flowers on 1-in pedicels, which result in purple-black fruit in summer. The fruits are a favorite of birds, but because of their size (small, pea sized) and color, are considered inconspicuous to humans.

== Cultivation ==
P. sargentii is a fast-growing ornamental tree requiring sun and well-drained soil. The tree can tolerate wind, but not air pollution; it is one of the hardiest cherries, and can be easily transplanted. This makes it suitable for use as a street tree. The tree is moderately drought-tolerant.

== History ==
Native to Korea and Japan, the tree was introduced to America and then the United Kingdom in 1908.

== Gallery ==
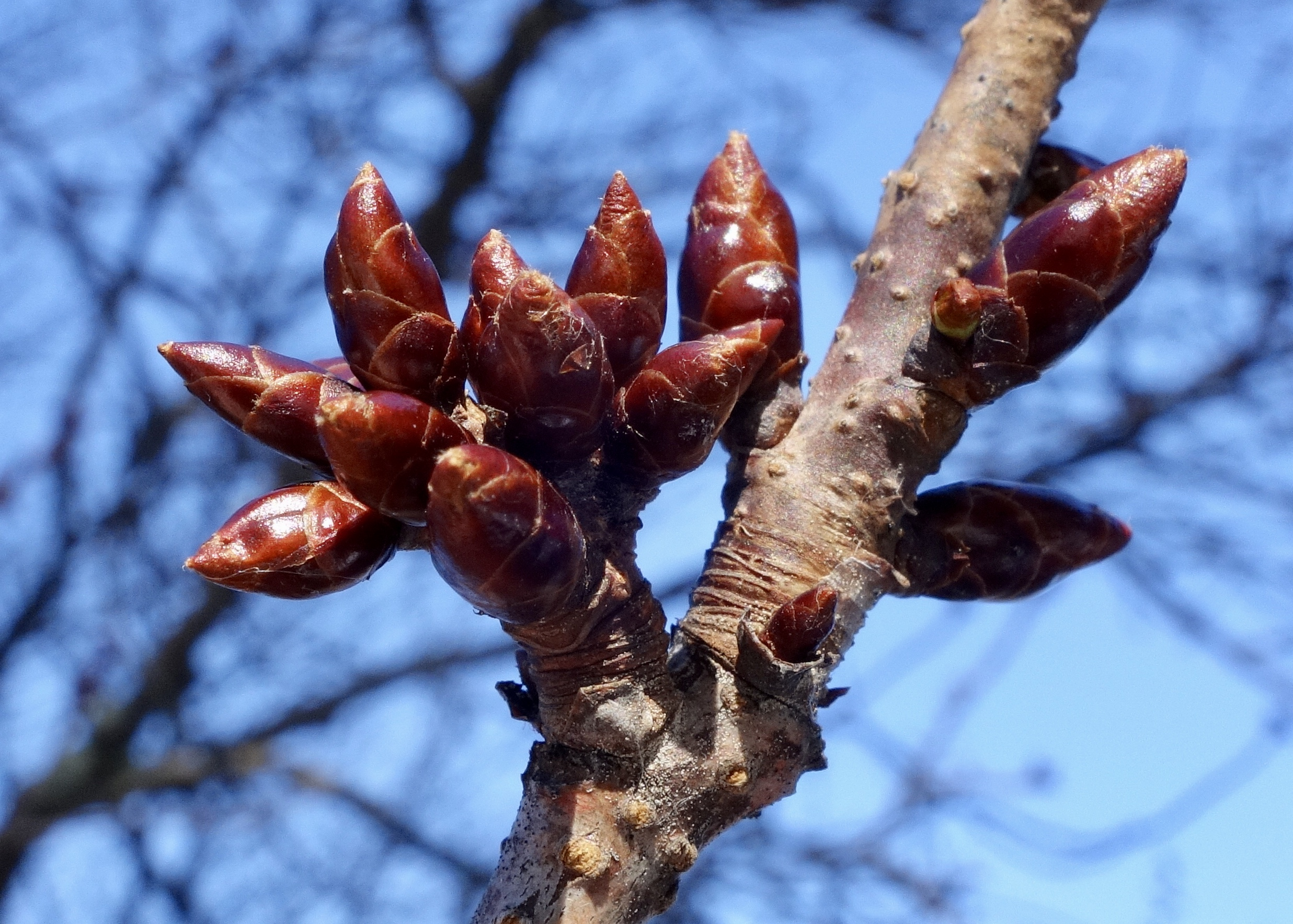
Buds

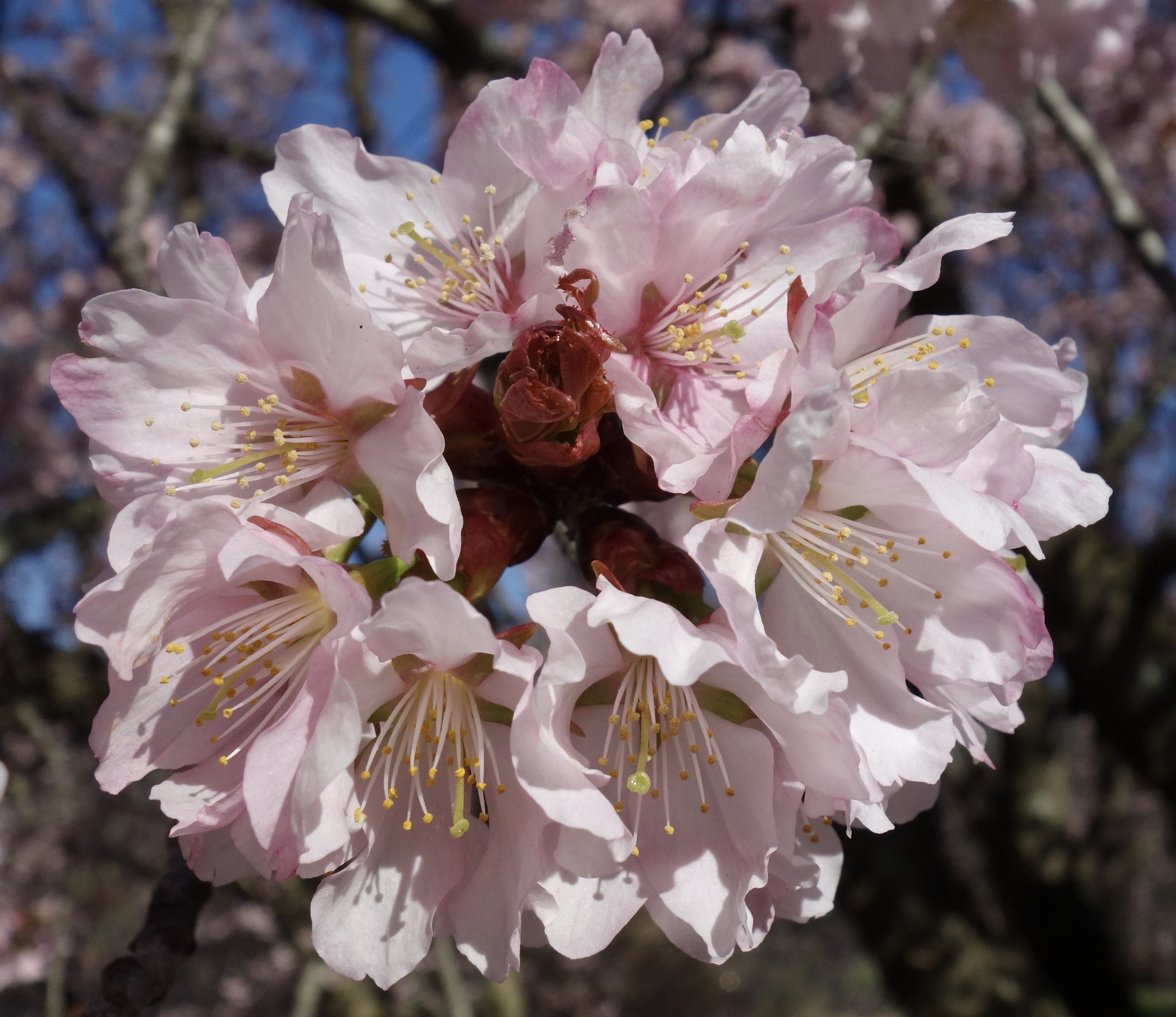
Flowers

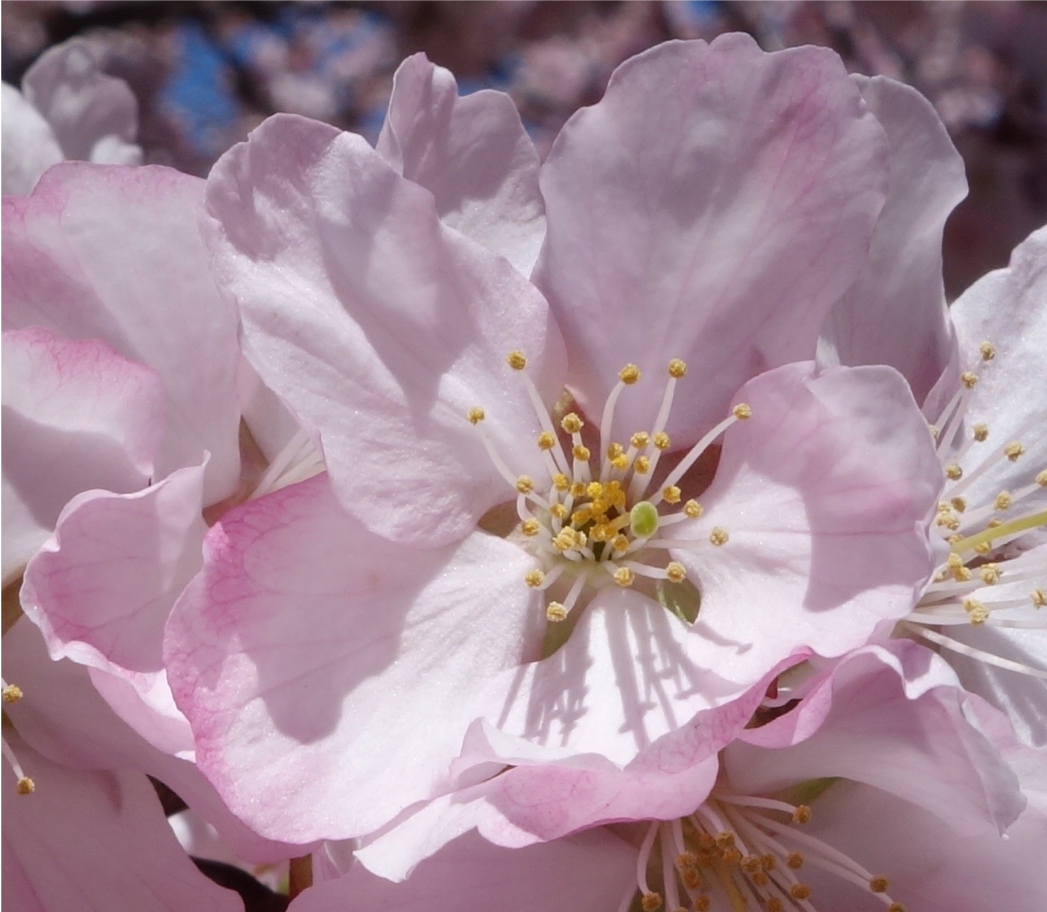
Flower detail

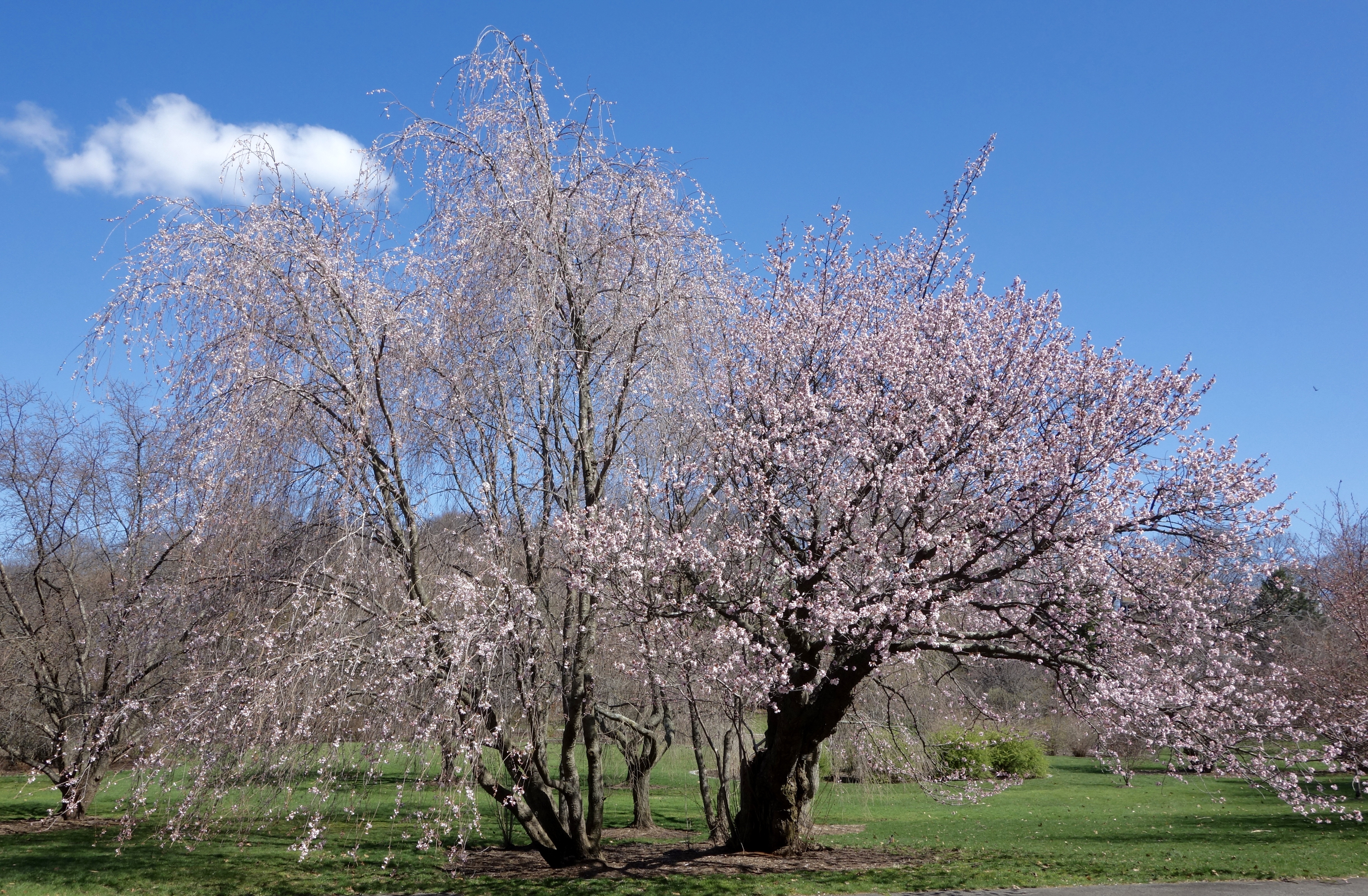
Prunus sargentii, 1928 accession (#794-28*B) Arnold Arboretum of Harvard University

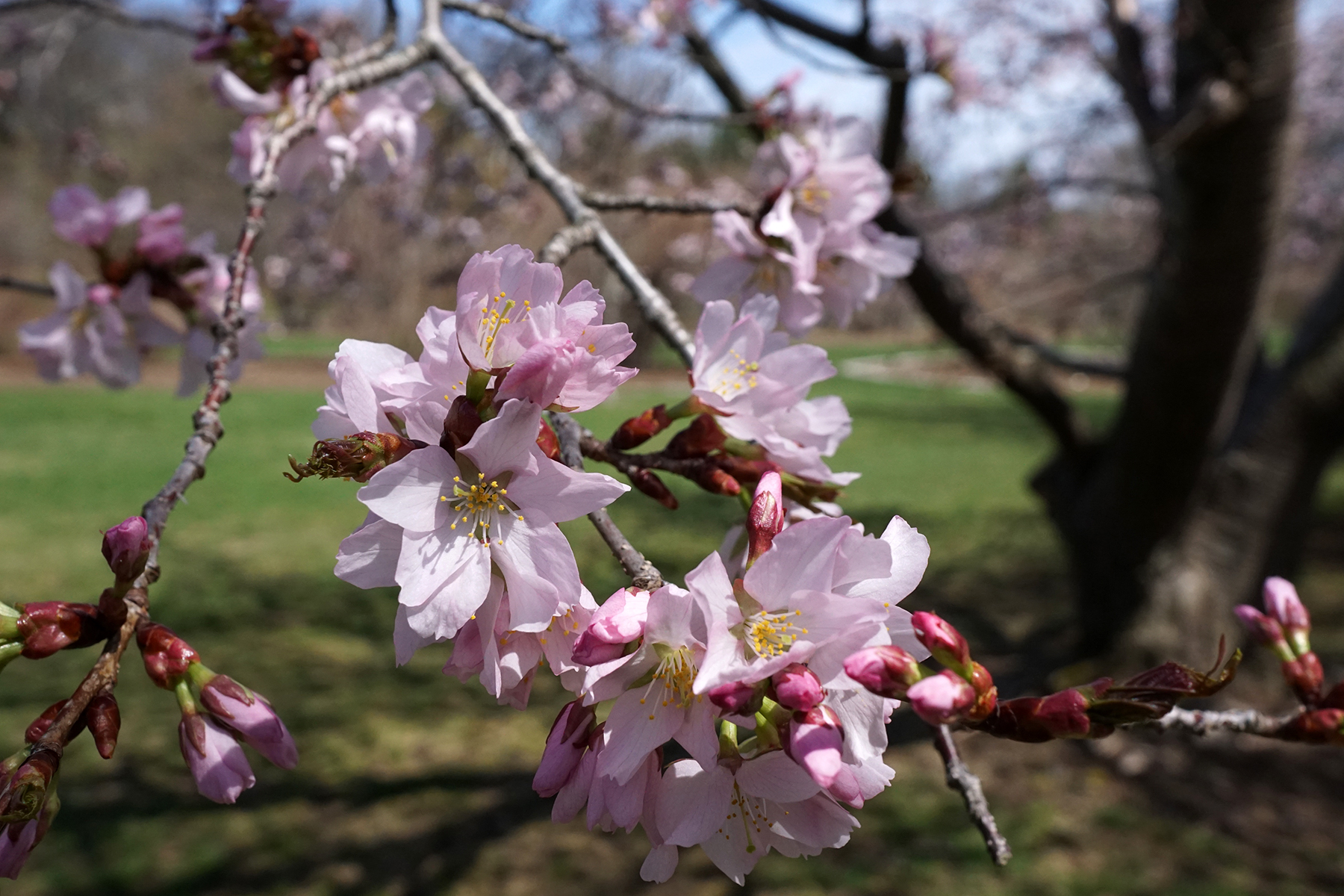
Flowers

== See also ==
- For cherry blossoms and their cultural significance to the Japanese, see sakura.
