= Tidal Basin =

Reservoir in Washington, D.C.

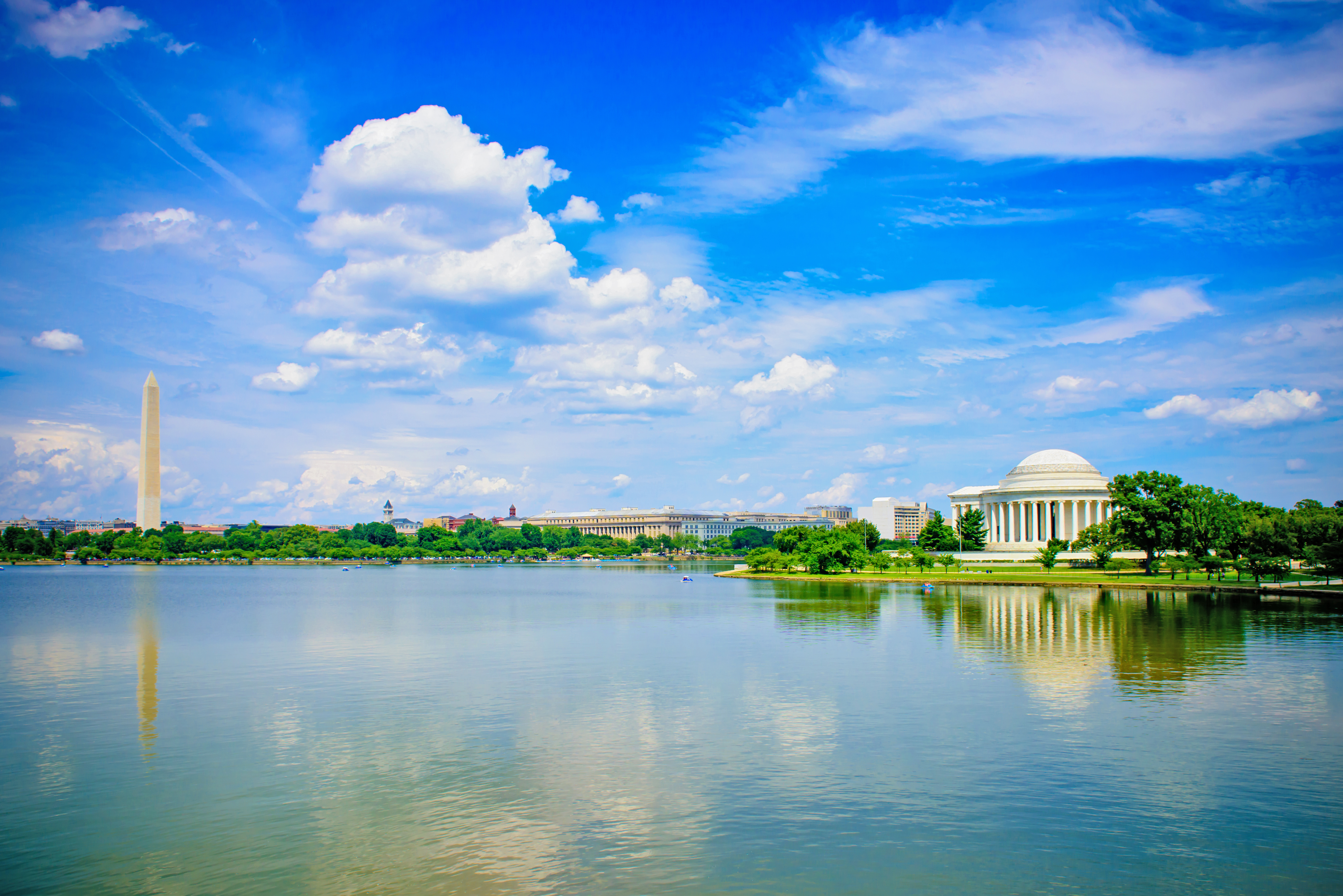
- The Tidal Basin (foreground), the Washington Monument (on left) and the Jefferson Memorial (on right), July 2016

- Location within the District of Columbia
- Location: West Potomac Park, Washington, D.C., U.S.
- Coordinates: 38°53′03″N 77°02′21″W
- Type: Artificial
- Primary inflows: Potomac River; 38°52′49″N 77°02′25″W
- Primary outflows: Washington Channel; 38°52′58″N 77°01′59″W
- Basin countries: United States
- Surface area: 107 acres (0.43 km^{2})
- Average depth: 10 feet (3.0 m)
- Surface elevation: 3 feet (0.91 m)
- References: "Tidal Basin". Geographic Names Information System. United States Geological Survey, United States Department of the Interior.

The Tidal Basin is a man-made reservoir located between the Potomac River and the Washington Channel in Washington, D.C. The Basin is part of West Potomac Park, is near the National Mall and is a focal point of the National Cherry Blossom Festival held each spring. The nearby Jefferson Memorial, Martin Luther King Jr. Memorial and Franklin Delano Roosevelt Memorial overlook the Basin, which is south of the Washington Monument.

== History ==
The concept of the Tidal Basin originated in the 1870s to serve both as a visual centerpiece and as a means for flushing the Washington Channel, a harbor separated from the Potomac River by landfills where East Potomac Park is now situated. Colonel Peter Conover Hains of the United States Army Corps of Engineers oversaw the Basin's design and construction.

The Basin was initially named the Tidal Reservoir. It later received the name of Twining Lake to honor Major William Johnson Twining of the Corps of Engineers, who served on the Board of Commissioners of the District of Columbia as its Engineer Commissioner during 1879.

In the Commissioners' annual report to Congress for that year, Major Twining proposed to create the tidal reservoir and use its water to help "flush" the Washington Channel. A 1917 map of Washington that the U.S. Public Buildings Commission prepared shows the Basin with the name "Twining Lake".

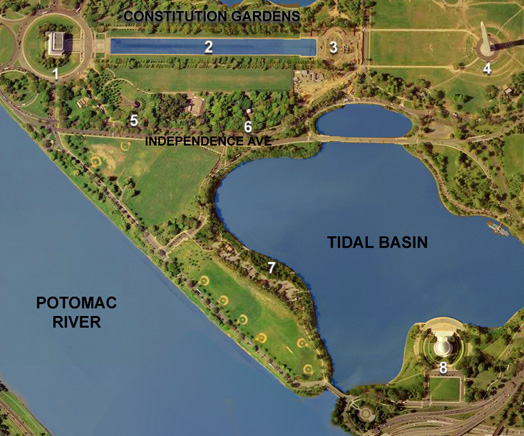
Satellite image of the western portion of the National Mall, the Tidal Basin and West Potomac Park (April 2002). The Washington Channel (not visible) is to the right of the Tidal Basin.

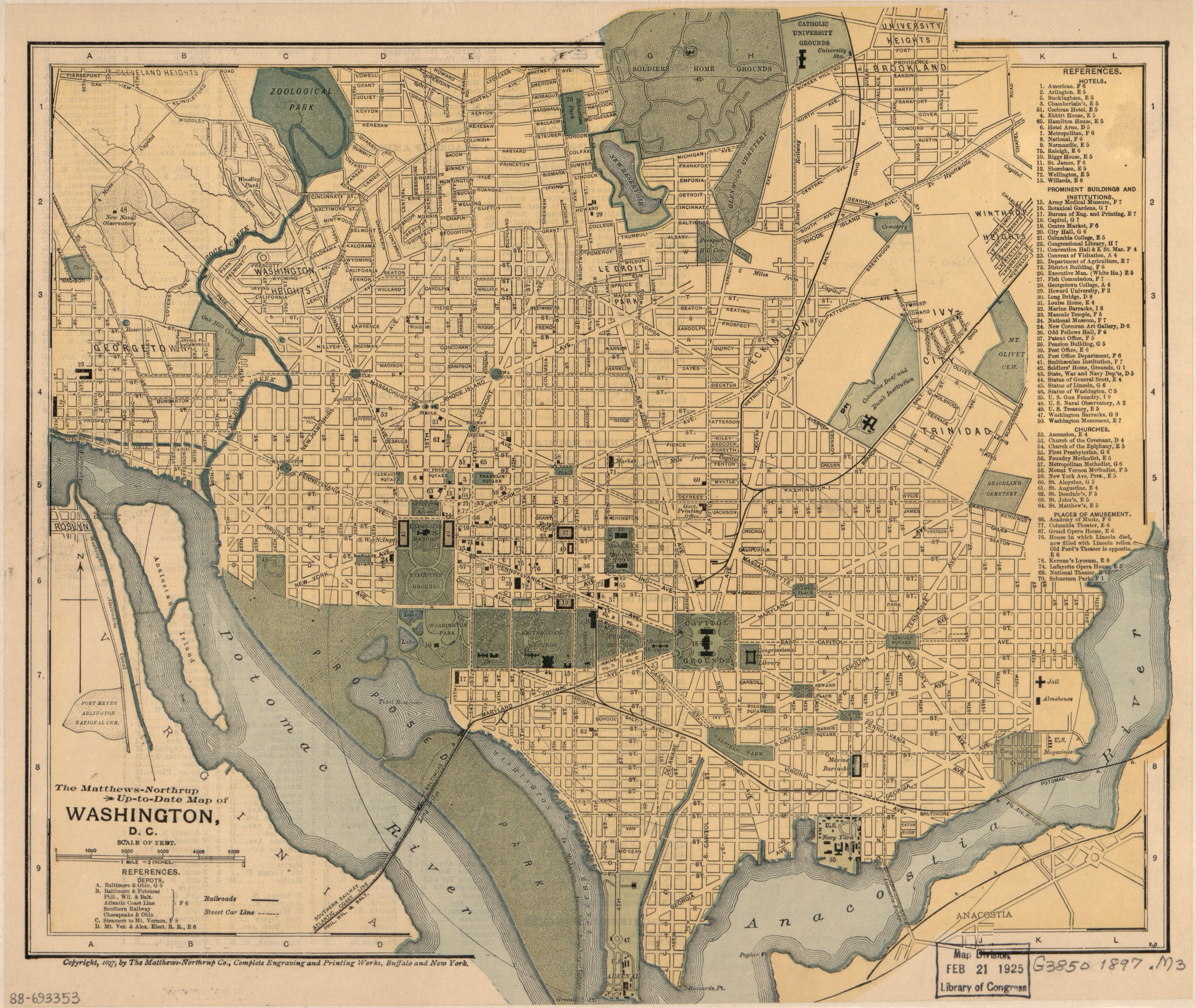
1897 map of Washington, D.C., showing the "Tidal Reservoir", the Potomac River and the Washington Channel

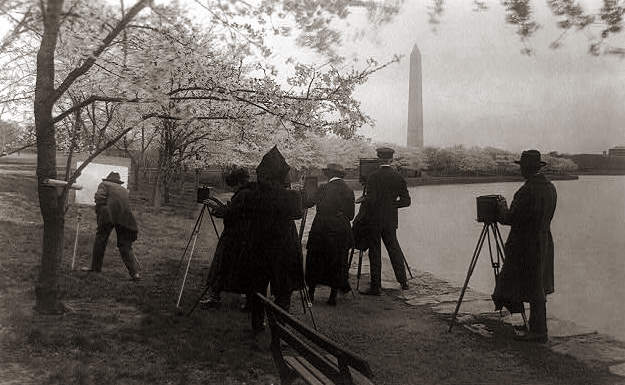
Tidal Basin between 1909 and 1932 with cherry trees in blossom

=== Tidal Basin Bathing Beach ===
In August 1918, the Congressionally funded Tidal Basin Bathing Beach opened in front of the site of the present-day Jefferson Memorial. Although the racially segregated beach was "a place to see people and be seen", a strictly enforced rule prohibited women's bathing suits that stopped more than six inches above the knee.

By one estimate, the beach attracted up to 20,000 people on a July day in 1920. The beach hosted beauty contests until 1922, when a beach official banned the pageants for being too risqué.

Congress had planned to open a separate beach for African-Americans nearby, but southern senators blocked the plan. Rather than integrating the beach, Congress ordered its dismantling in 1925.

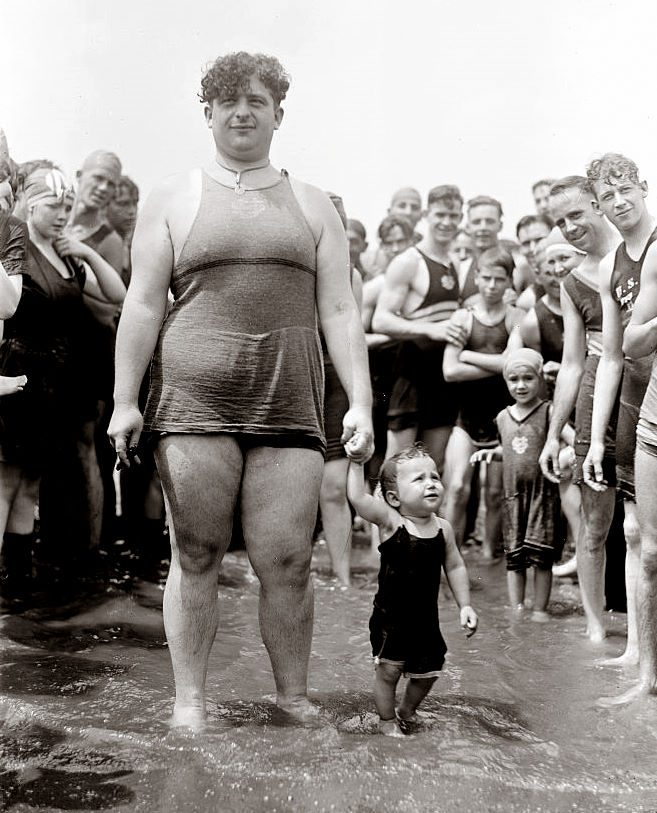
Tidal Basin beauty contest (1919)

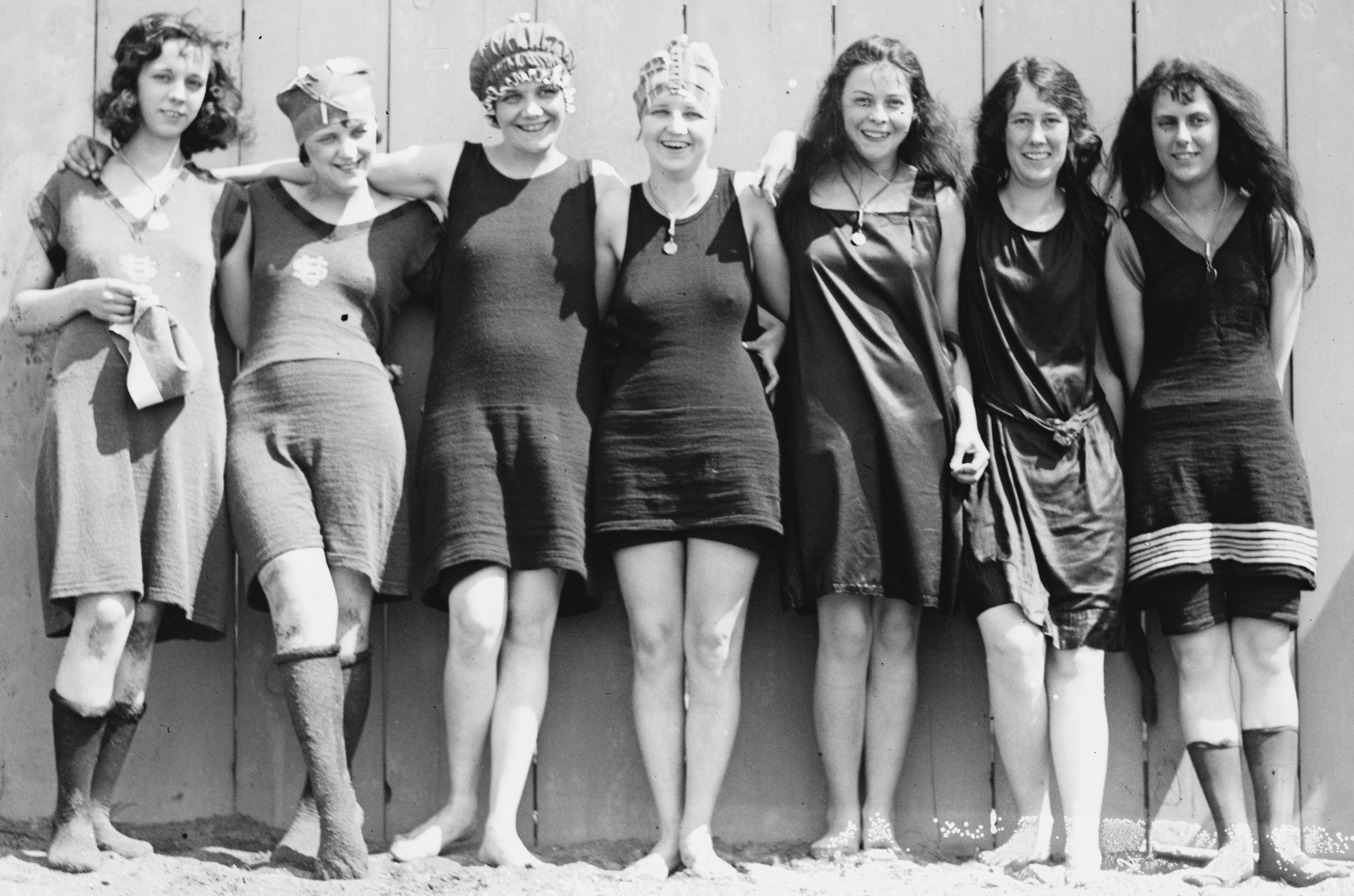
Female swimmers posing at the Tidal Basin Bathing Beach (1920)

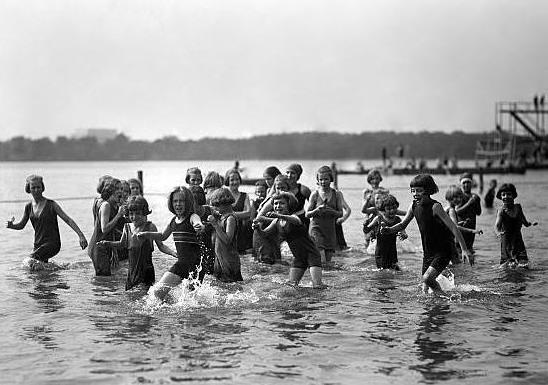
Orphan girls playing in the Tidal Basin in 1924. A float and a diving platform are in the background.

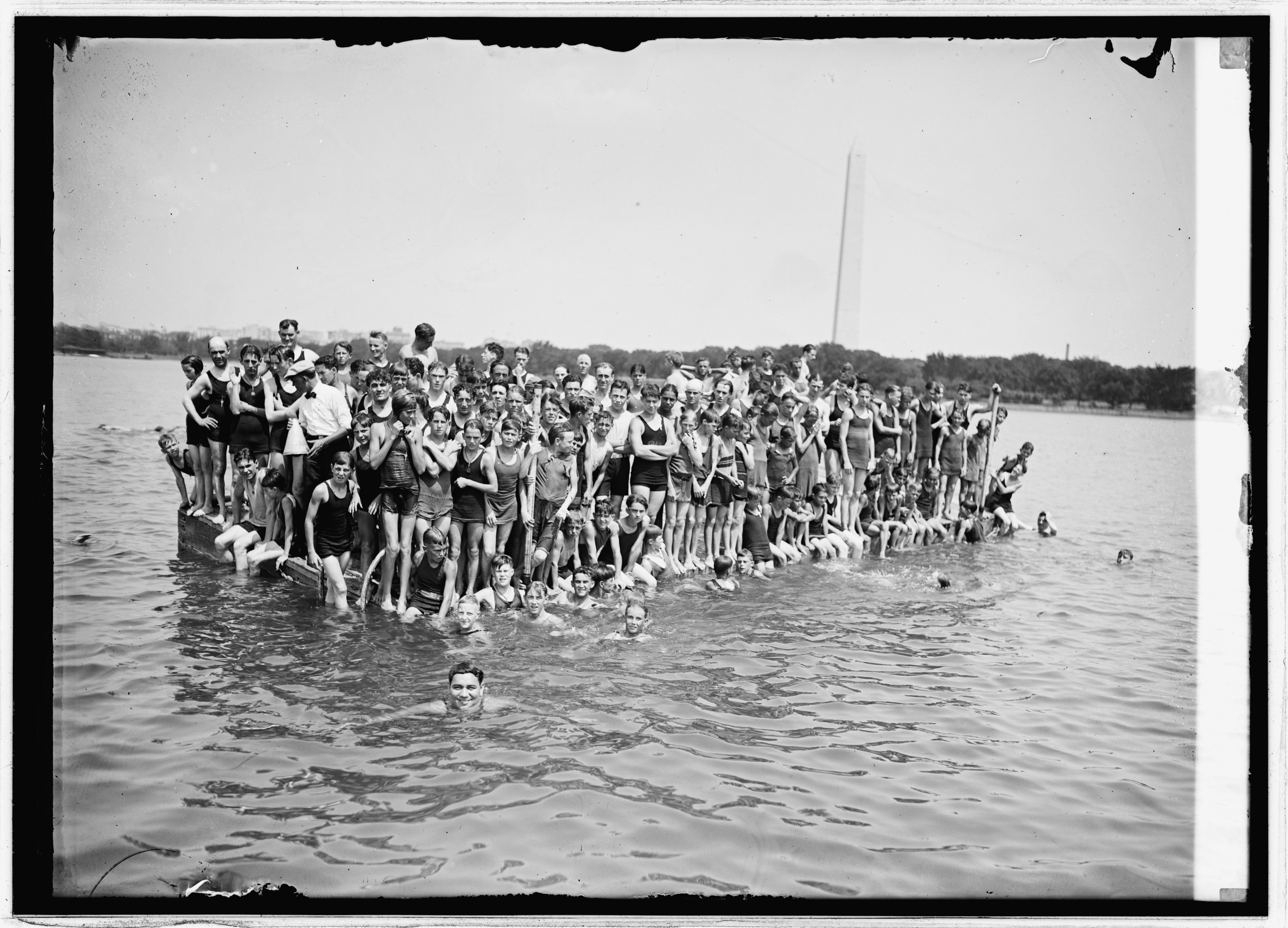
Swimmers and an announcer participating in an event at the Tidal Basin Bathing Beach, with the Washington Monument in the background. (August 1924)

=== Incidents ===
The Tidal Basin was the scene of an incident involving the Chairman of the United States House Committee on Ways and Means, Democratic Congressman Wilbur Mills. At 2:00 a.m. on October 7, 1974, Park police stopped Mills' speeding car, whose driver, Albert G. Gapacini, had not turned on its headlights. Also in the car was an Argentine stripper known as Fanne Foxe. After the police stopped the car, Foxe jumped into the nearby Tidal Basin and was rescued. Police stated that both Mills and Foxe were intoxicated and that Mills was bleeding from his nose and scratches on his face.

== Design ==
The Tidal Basin covers an area of about 107 acres (43 ha) and is 10 feet (3.0 m) deep. The Army Corps of Engineers designed the Basin to enable it to release 250 million US gallons (950,000 m^{3}) of water captured at high tide twice a day. The inlet gates, located on the Potomac side of the Basin, allow water to enter the Basin during high tide. During this time, the outlet gates, on the Washington Channel side, close to store incoming water and block the flow of water and sediment into the channel.

As the tide begins to ebb, the general outflow of water from the Basin forces the inlet gates to close. This same force is applied to the outlet gates, which open into the channel. The force of the water running into the channel sweeps away the Basin's built-up silt

The Corps, which maintains the Basin's gates, has restored their functioning. As part of the restoration and redesign of the Lincoln Memorial Reflecting Pool, completed in 2012, water is pumped from the Basin to fill the pool.

== Recreation ==
From mid-March until October, paddle-boats are available for rent at a dock near the eastern end of the Tidal Basin. The activity is popular during the Cherry Blossom Festival, which takes place in April.

== Future plans ==
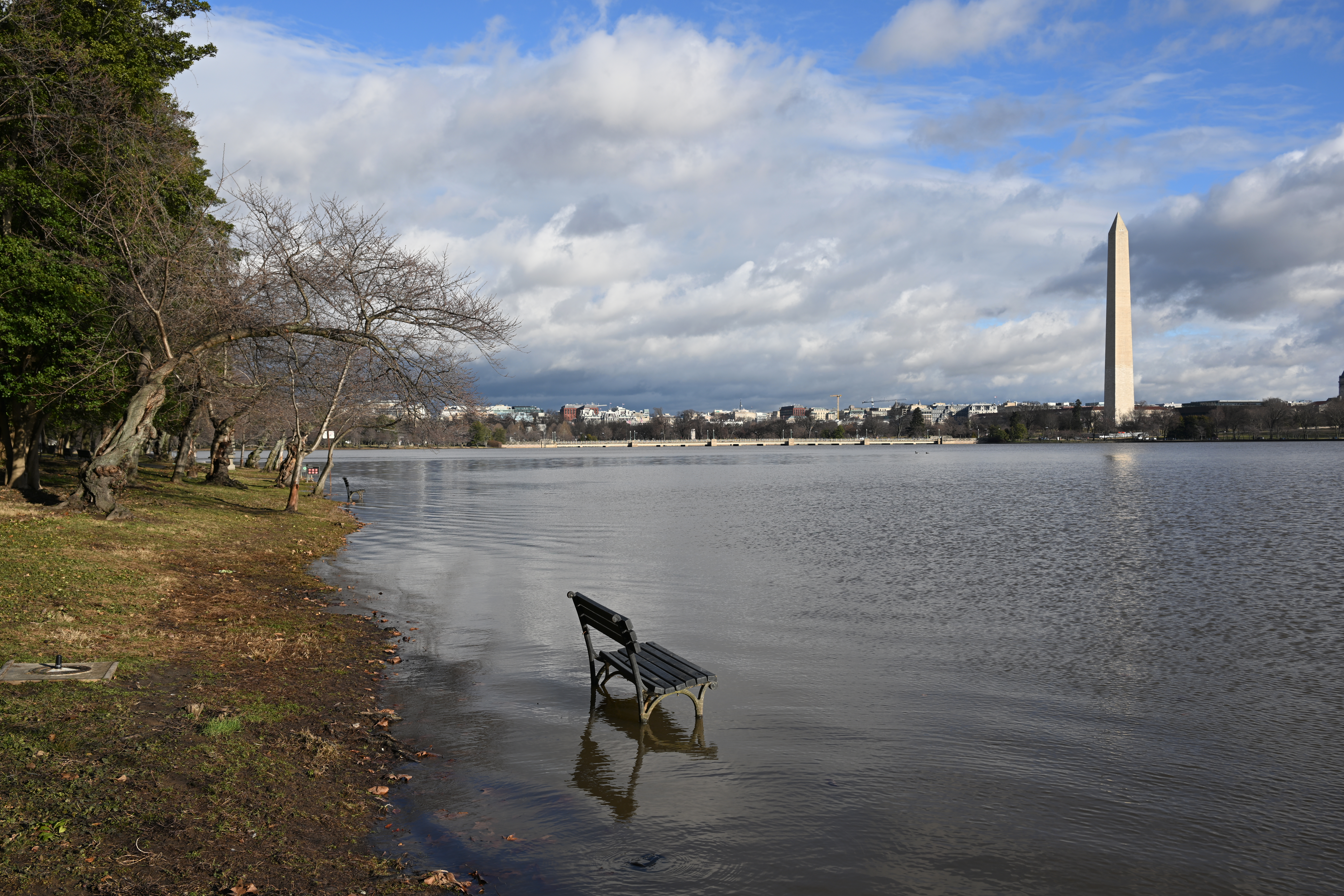
Flooded bench at the Tidal Basin (January 2024)

Sea level rise and land subsidence has caused portions of the paths next to the water to regularly flood at high tide. To address this problem, the Trust for the National Mall brought together in 2020 five design firms to re-imagine the Tidal Basin's future. After completing an environmental assessment that found that a planned project would have no significant impact "on the natural, cultural or human environment" in the area, the National Park Service (NPS) then announced in 2023 that would renovate approximately linear 6,800 feet (2,073 m) of seawall along the Basin and parts of West Potomac Park.

The Basin's seawall will become 4.75 feet (1.45 m) taller and will stand on a new foundation to prevent it from sinking further. The NPS will increase the widths of the walkways around the Basin from the existing 8 feet (2.44 m) to a planned 12 feet (3.7 m) by enlarging the area's paved surface and reducing its green space. In August 2023, the NPS awarded a $113 million contract to construct the project, which it expected to start in mid-2024 and take three years to reach completion. In 2024, the National Park Service cut 158 of the nearly 3,700 cherry trees total to rebuild the seawall.

== Kutz Memorial Bridge ==
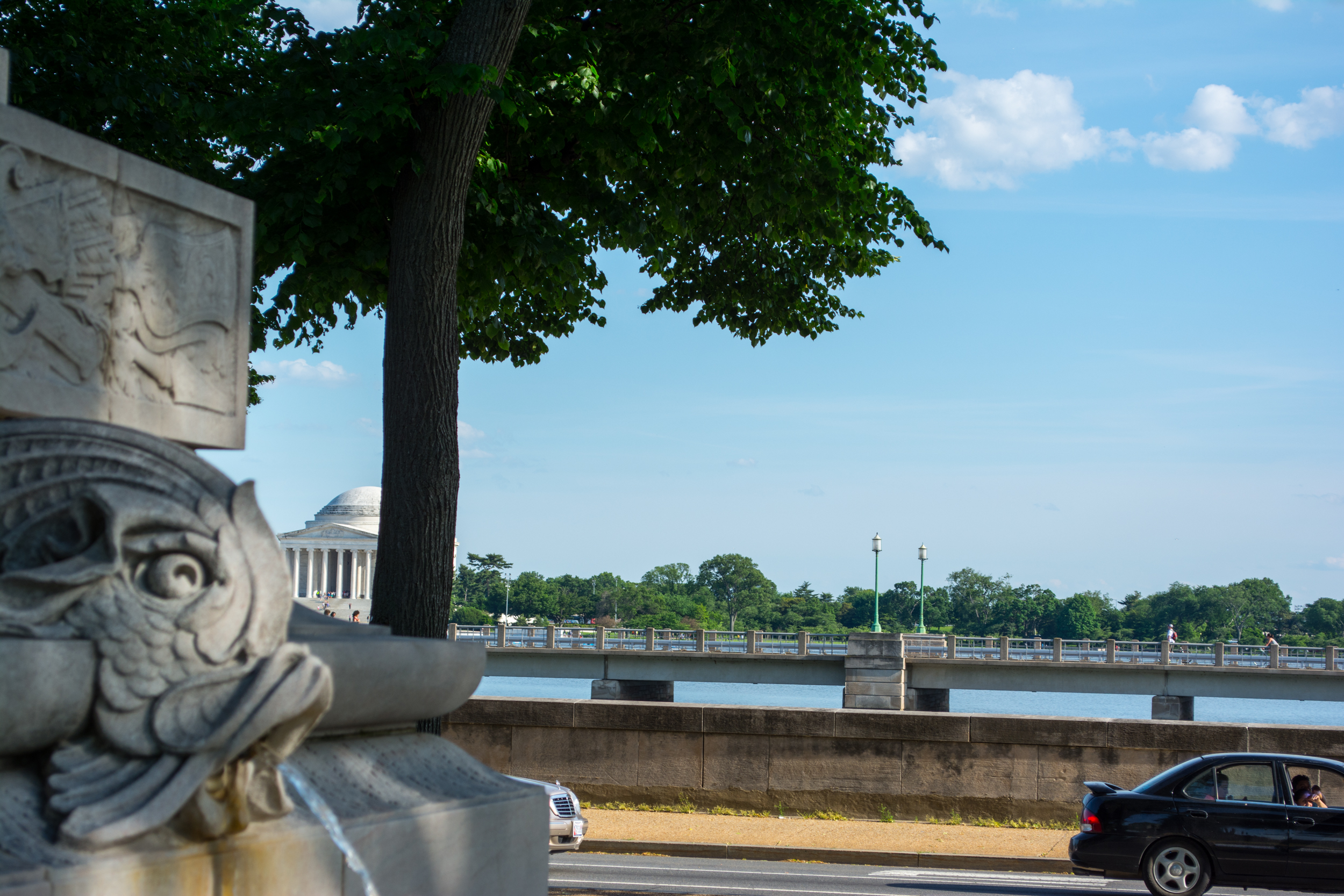
Kutz Memorial Bridge (May 2014)

The Kutz Memorial Bridge crosses the northern lobe of the Tidal Basin, carrying eastbound Independence Avenue traffic in three lanes. The bridge's name commemorates Brigadier General Charles Willauer Kutz, a Commissioner of Engineering for the District of Columbia during the first half of the 20th century.

Architect Paul Philippe Cret designed the multi-span plate girder bridge, which the engineering firm of Alexander and Repass constructed. Construction began in 1941 and reached completion in 1943. The bridge was dedicated after alterations in 1954. The structure is made of concrete and steel on pilings with granite facing. It is 433 ft (132 m) long and 46 ft (14 m) wide.

== Panorama ==
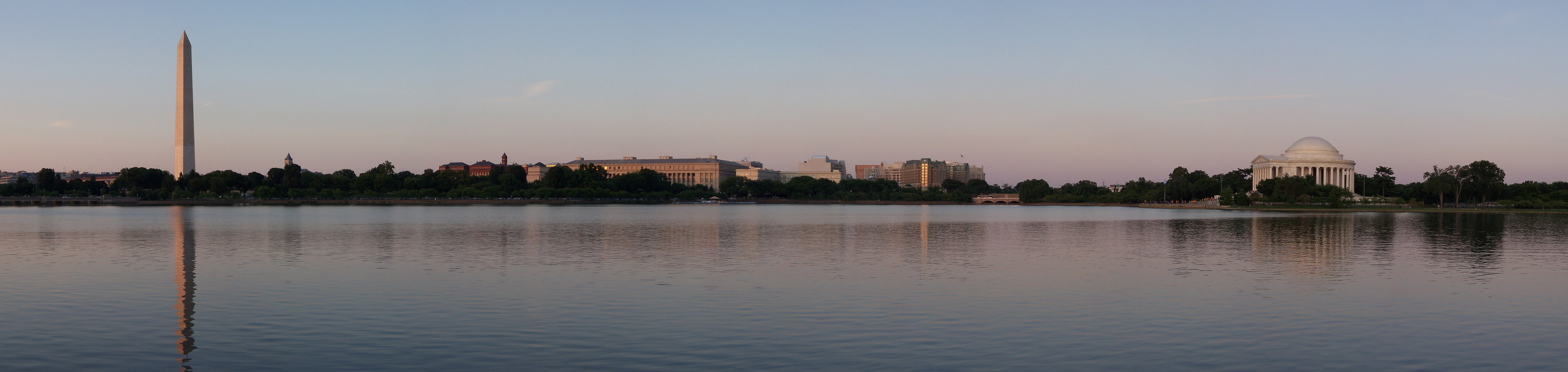
The Tidal Basin as seen from the Franklin Delano Roosevelt Memorial in July 2009, showing The Washington Monument on the left and the Jefferson Memorial on the right.

== Images ==
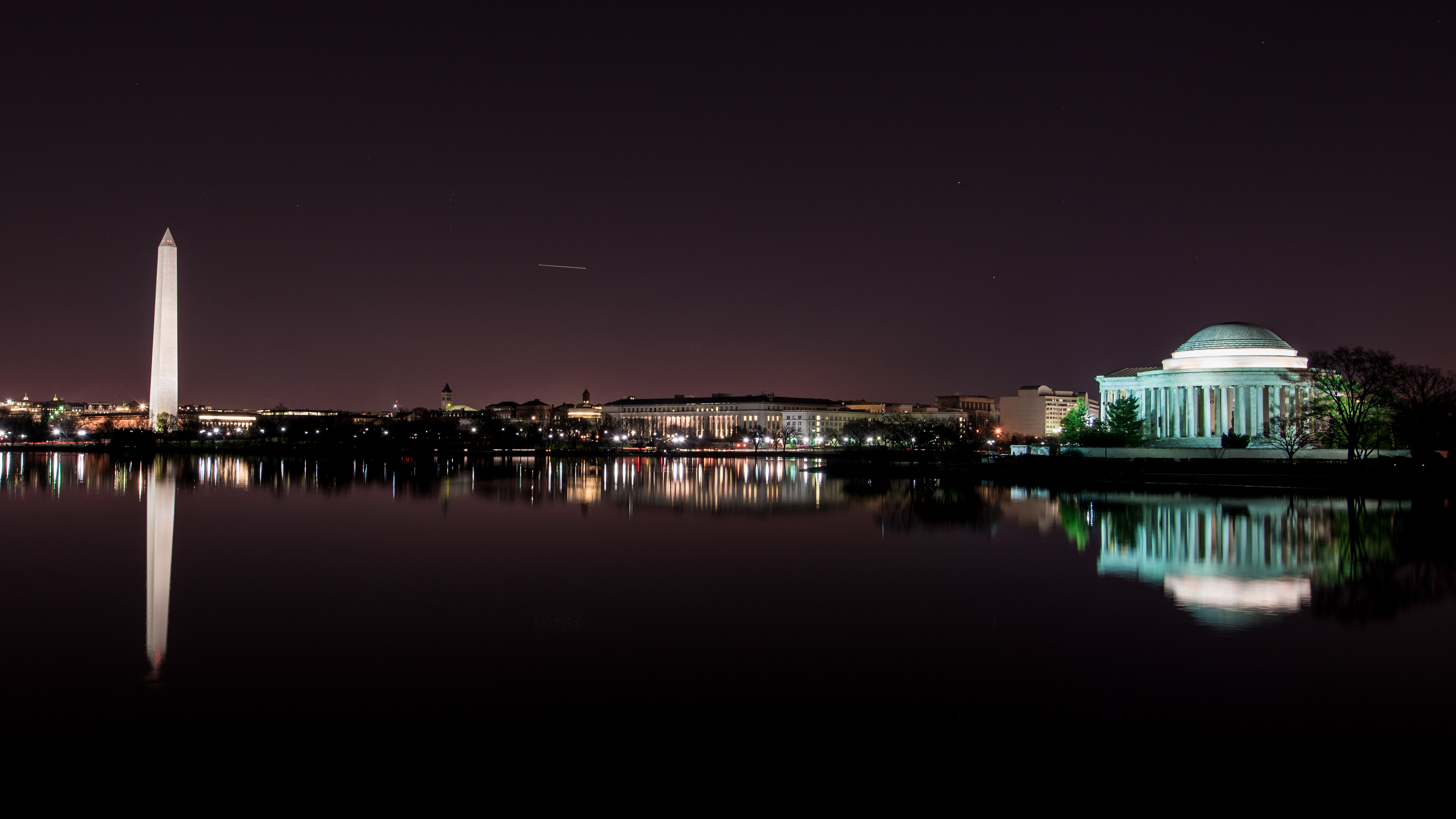
The Tidal Basin at night.

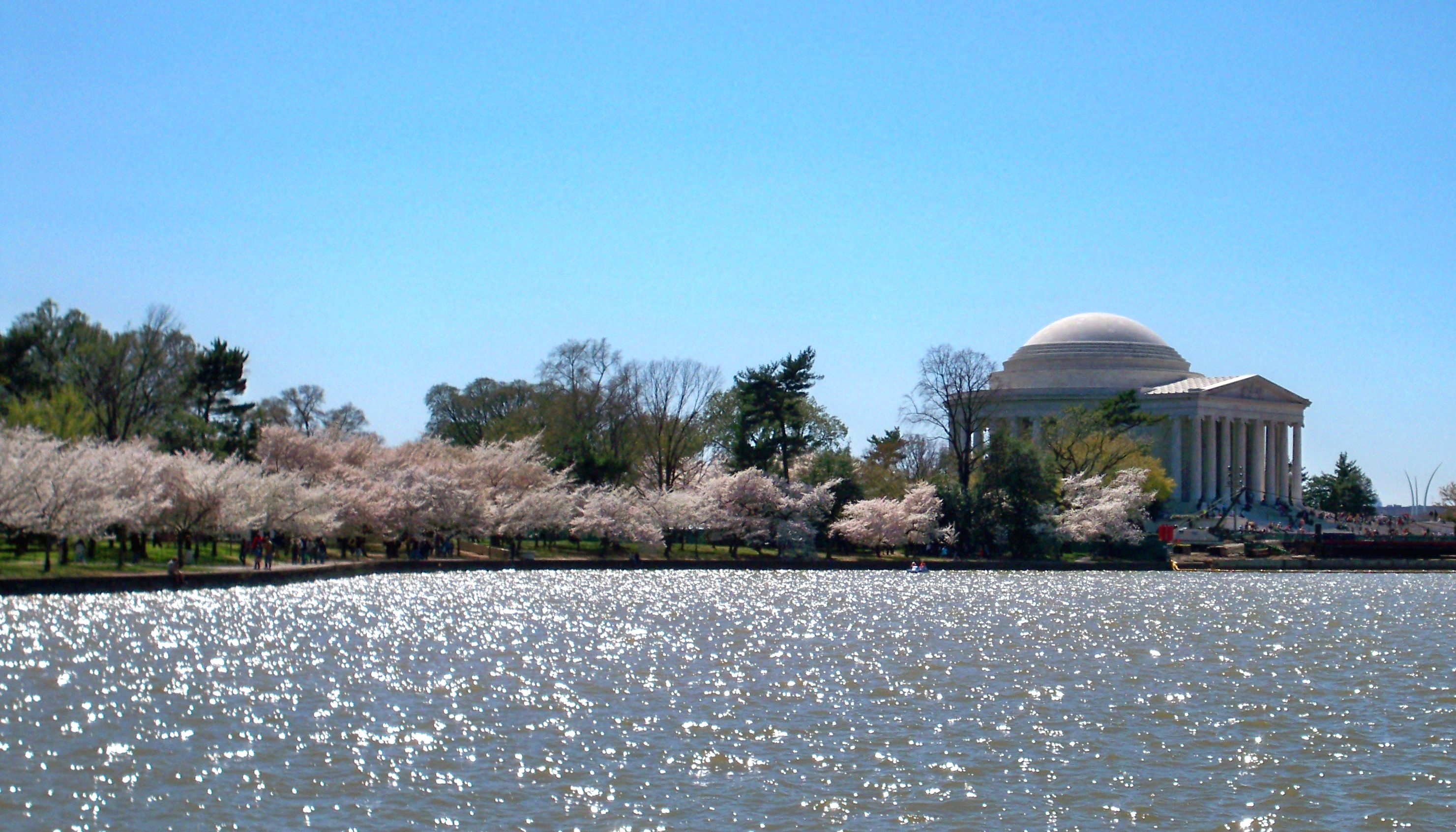
The Tidal Basin and the Jefferson Memorial during the 2010 National Cherry Blossom Festival (March 31, 2010)

Cherry blossoms at the Tidal Basin in the afternoon

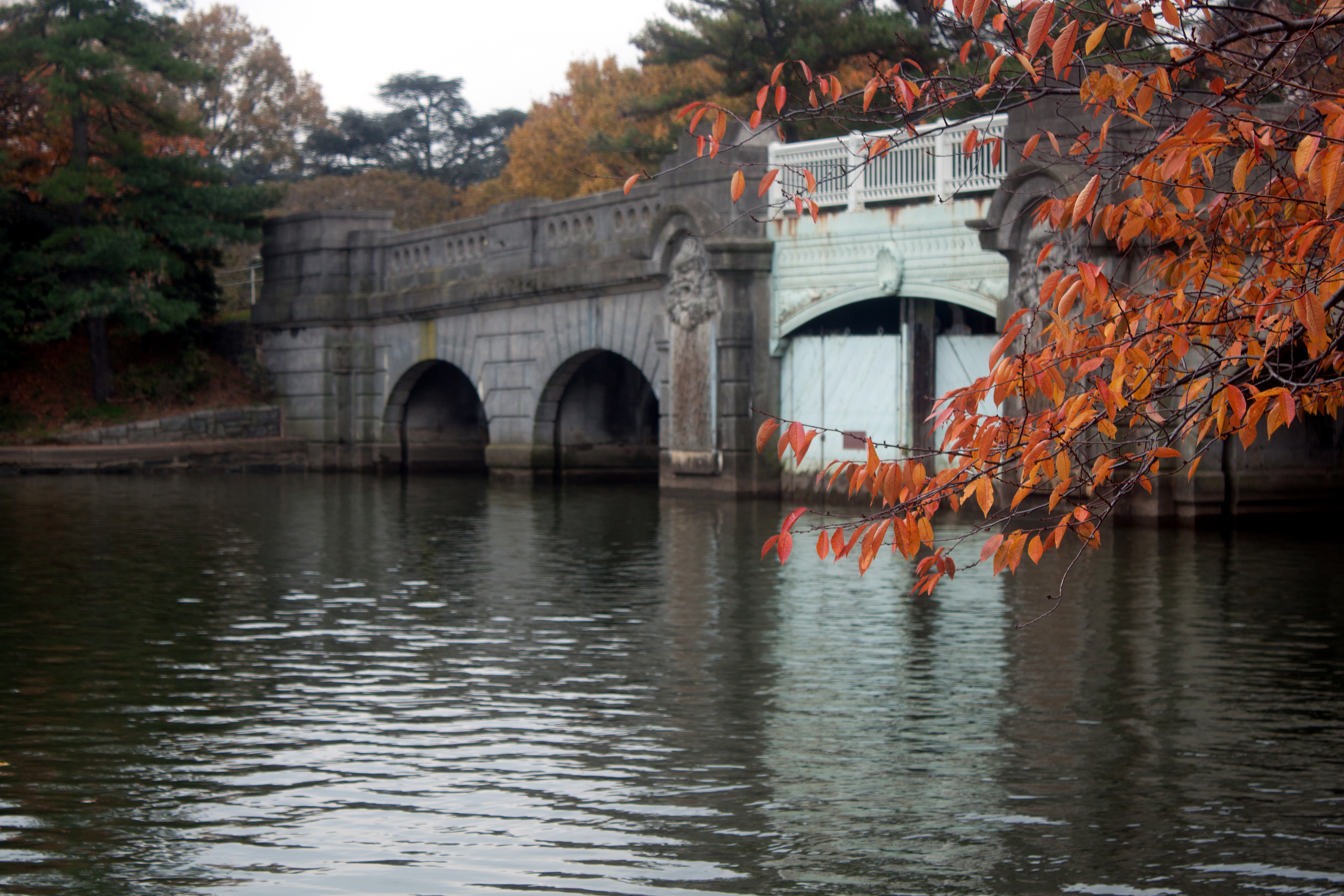
Inlet gate
(November 2011)

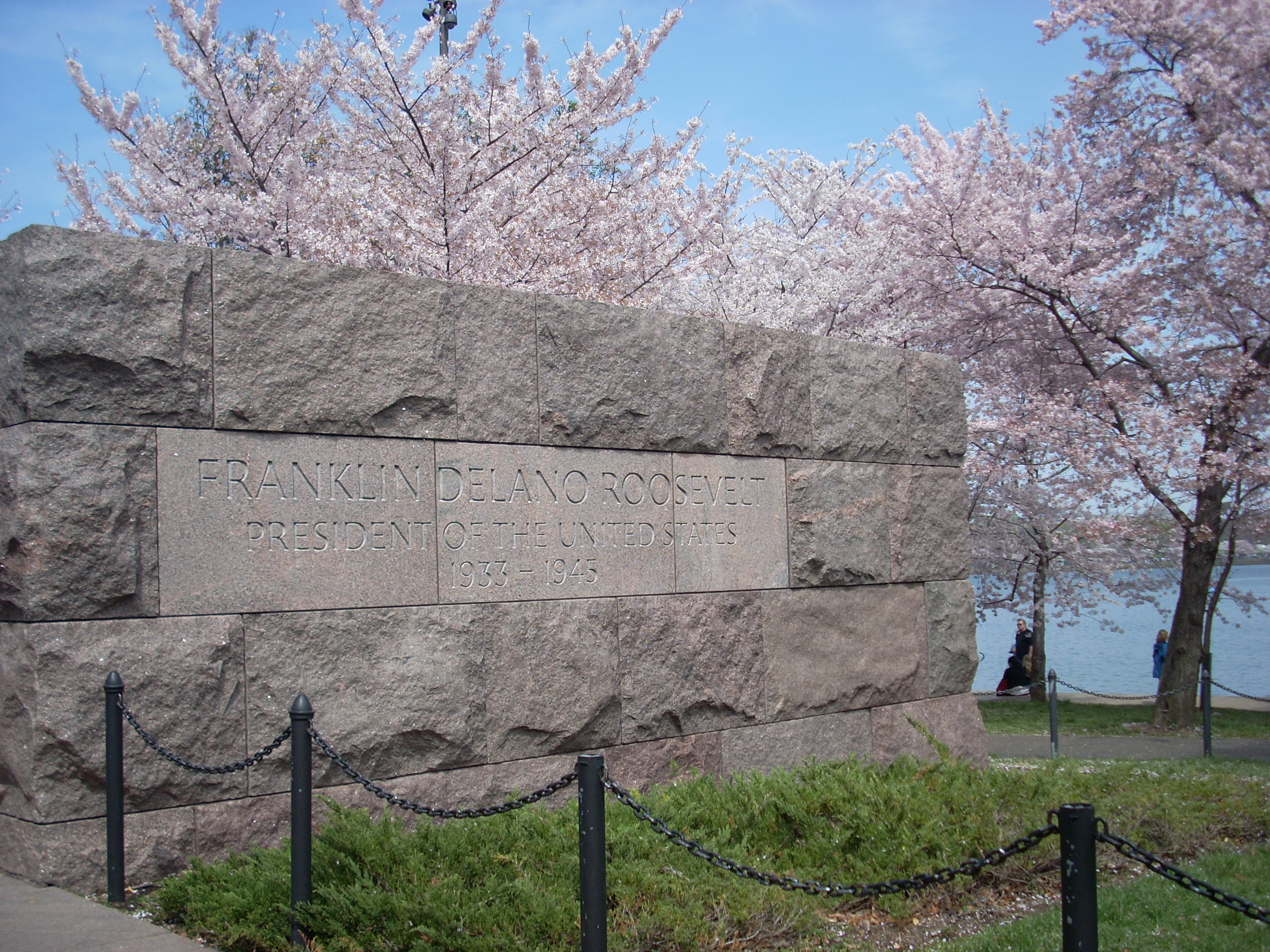
Franklin Delano Roosevelt Memorial
(April 20, 2008)

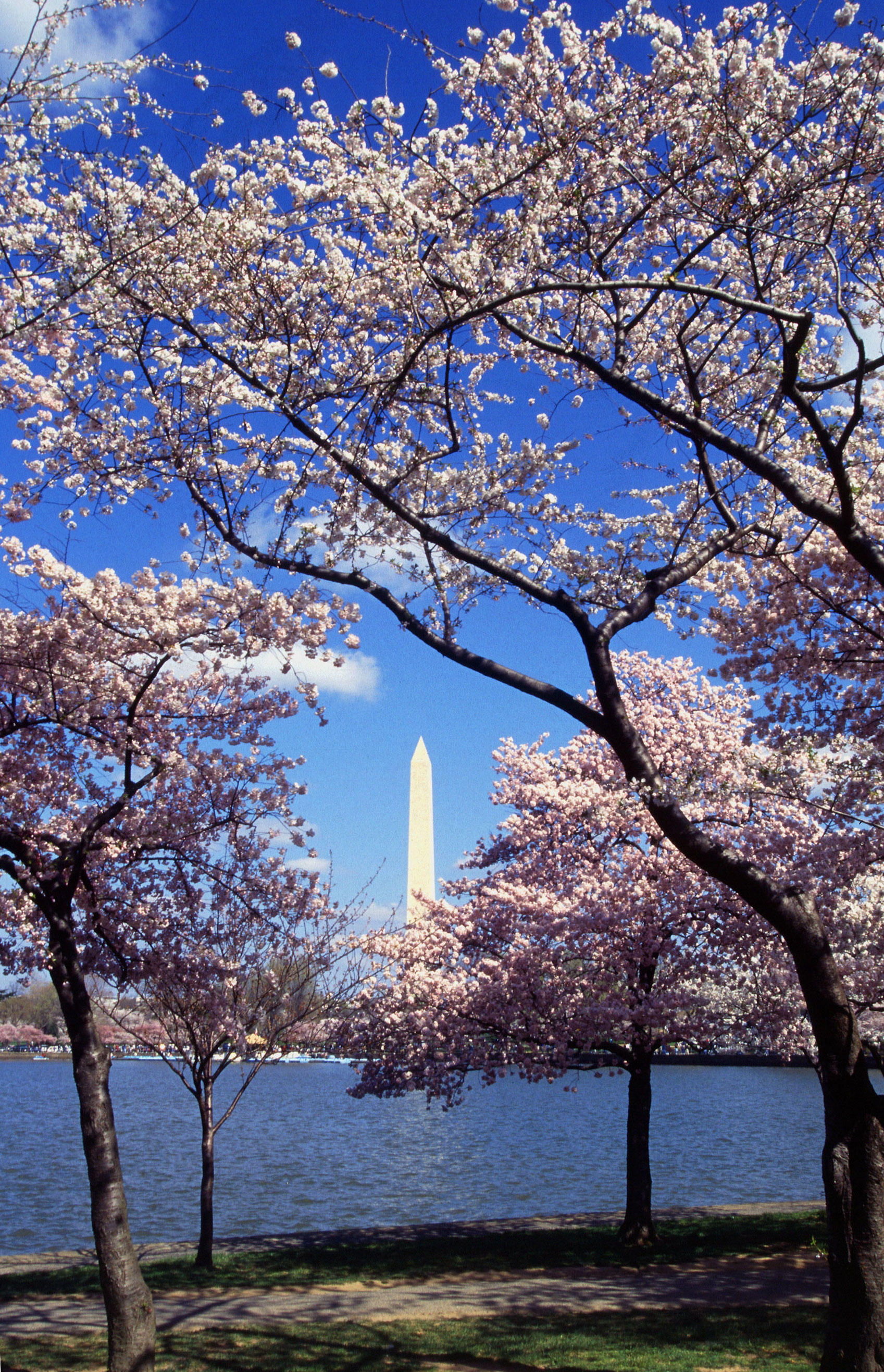
The Tidal Basin with cherry blossoms (April 1999)

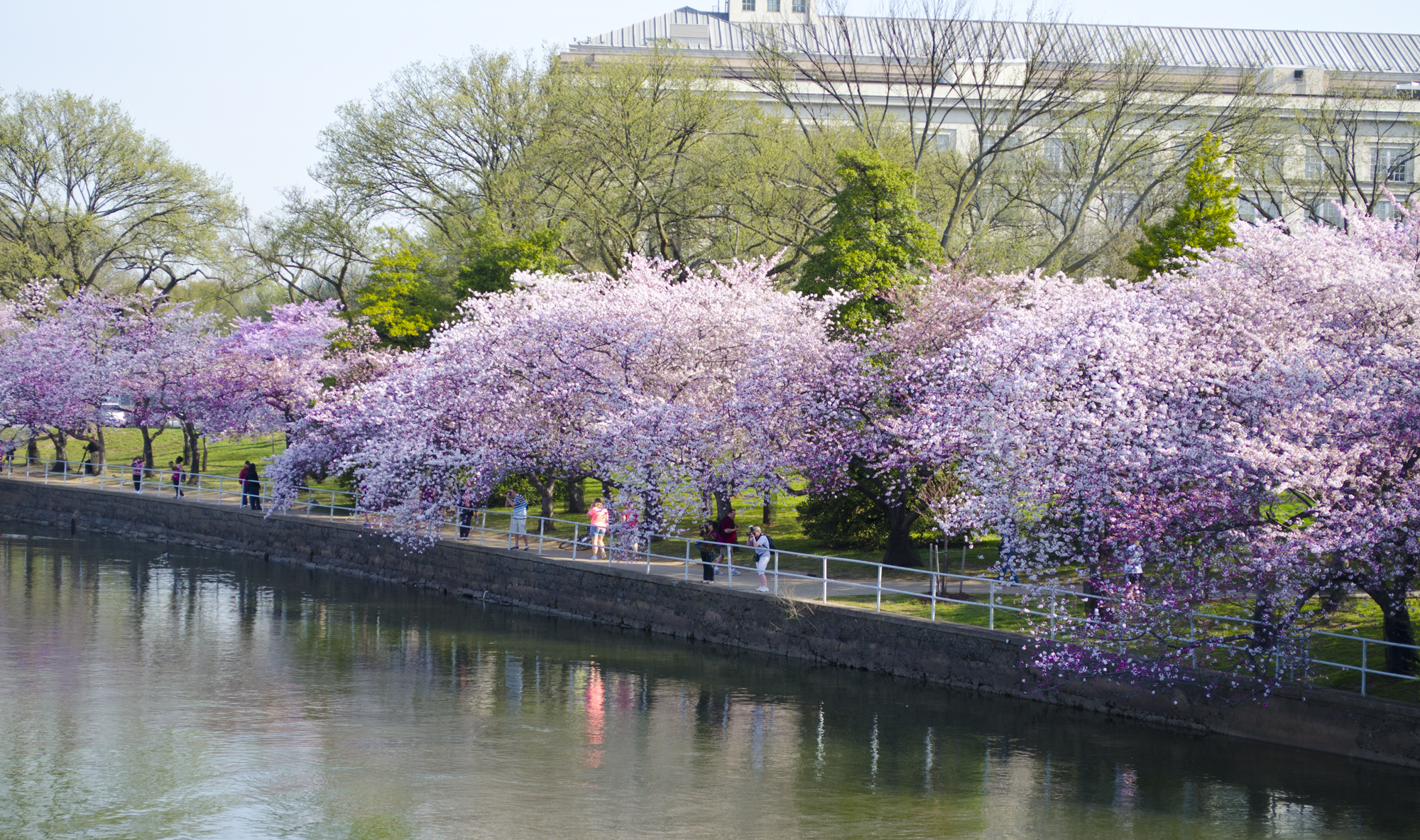
Tidal Basin cherry blossoms (April 9, 2013)

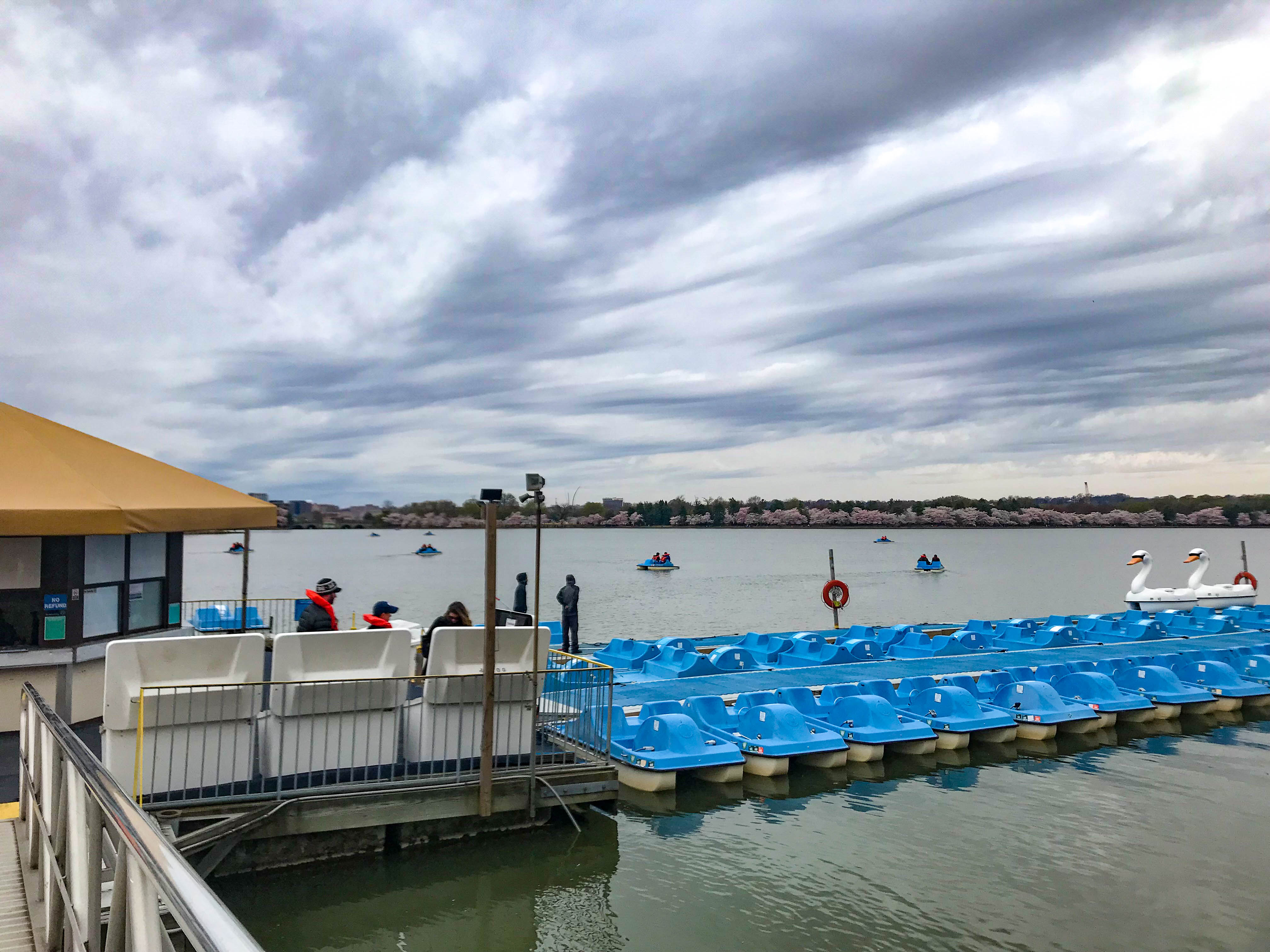
Tidal Basin marina and paddle boat dock (April 2, 2019)

== See also ==
- West Potomac Park
- List of lakes in the Washington, D.C. area
- Architecture of Washington, D.C.
