= Charles Keller (military) =

United States Army Brigadier General (1868–1949)

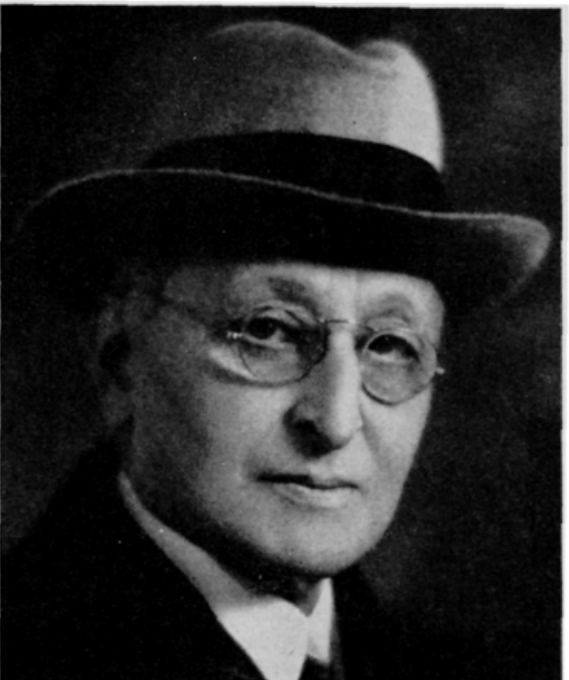
- Born: February 13, 1868; Rochester, New York, U.S.
- Died: September 16, 1949 (aged 81); Coronado, California, U.S.
- Burial place: Arlington National Cemetery
- Education: United States Military Academy (B.S.)
- Spouse: Frances Rosenfield (m. 1897)
- Military career
- Branch: United States Army
- Service years: 1890–1923; 1940–1943
- Rank: Brigadier General
- Service number: O-331
- Unit: Corps of Engineers
- Conflicts: Spanish–American War; Philippine–American War; World War I World War II
- Awards: Army Distinguished Service Medal; Legion of Merit; French Legion of Honour
- Other work: Businessman

Engineer Commissioner of the District of Columbia
- In office October 6, 1921 – June 25, 1923
- President: Warren G. Harding
- Preceded by: Col. Charles Willauer Kutz
- Succeeded by: Maj. James Franklin Bell

Charles Keller (February 13, 1868 – September 16, 1949) was a United States Army Brigadier General and businessman.

== Early life ==
Charles Keller was born in Rochester, New York, on February 13, 1868, the son of Isaac and Fanny Keller. He was appointed to the United States Military Academy from New York.

== Military service ==
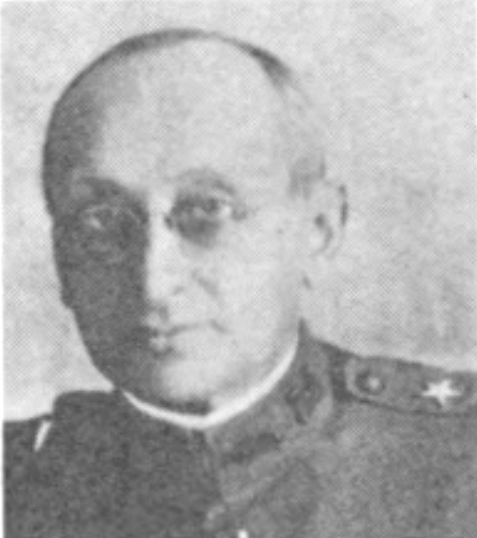
Keller as a brigadier general.

Keller graduated from the academy second of fifty-four in the class of 1890 and was commissioned a second lieutenant (ASN: O-331) in the United States Army Corps of Engineers. He was assigned to the United States Army Engineer School in Willets Point from 1890 until his graduation in 1893. Keller was then in charge of the supervision of river and harbor improvements in Alabama and northwestern Florida from 1893 to 1894. From 1894 to 1898, he was assigned to Rock Island, Illinois.

In 1898, Keller was in charge of torpedo defence in the harbors of Charleston and Port Royal, South Carolina and later temporarily assigned to Rock Island again. From 1898 to 1899, he was assigned to Portland, Maine, and later served as secretary of the Missouri River Commission from 1899 to 1901. From 1901 to 1903, he was in charge of improvements of rivers and harbors on the east shore of Lake Michigan near Grand Rapids. From 1903 to 1905, he served as the commanding officer of Company K, 3rd Battalion of Engineers. During this same time he also served on duty in the Philippine Islands as an engineer officer for the Department of Mindanao and later engineer for the Moro Province in Zamboanga City. In 1905, he served as the commanding officer of the 3rd Battalion of Engineers.

When Keller returned to the states he took charge of the U.S. Lake Survey in 1905, served as engineer for the 11th Lighthouse District (Detroit), and was a member of several engineer boards. He was promoted to major in January 1907. As a member of the Niagara Falls Committee he was instrumental in bringing about more efficient production of hydroelectric power. He then served as district engineer at Rock Island and inspector of the 13th Lighthouse District (Detroit, Michigan).

Keller was promoted to lieutenant colonel in December 1913. From 1913 to 1916, he served as the Officer in Charge of Sea Coast Defenses for river & harbor improvements in the Mobile District, Alabama. From 1916 to 1918, he served as Assistant to the Chief of Engineers and Chief of the Miscellaneous Civil Section in the Office of the Chief of Engineers. Keller received a temporary promotion to colonel in August 1917. He then served as secretary of the Committee on Inland Waterways of the Railroad Administration and joint national power administrator for the Department of War and War Industries Board.

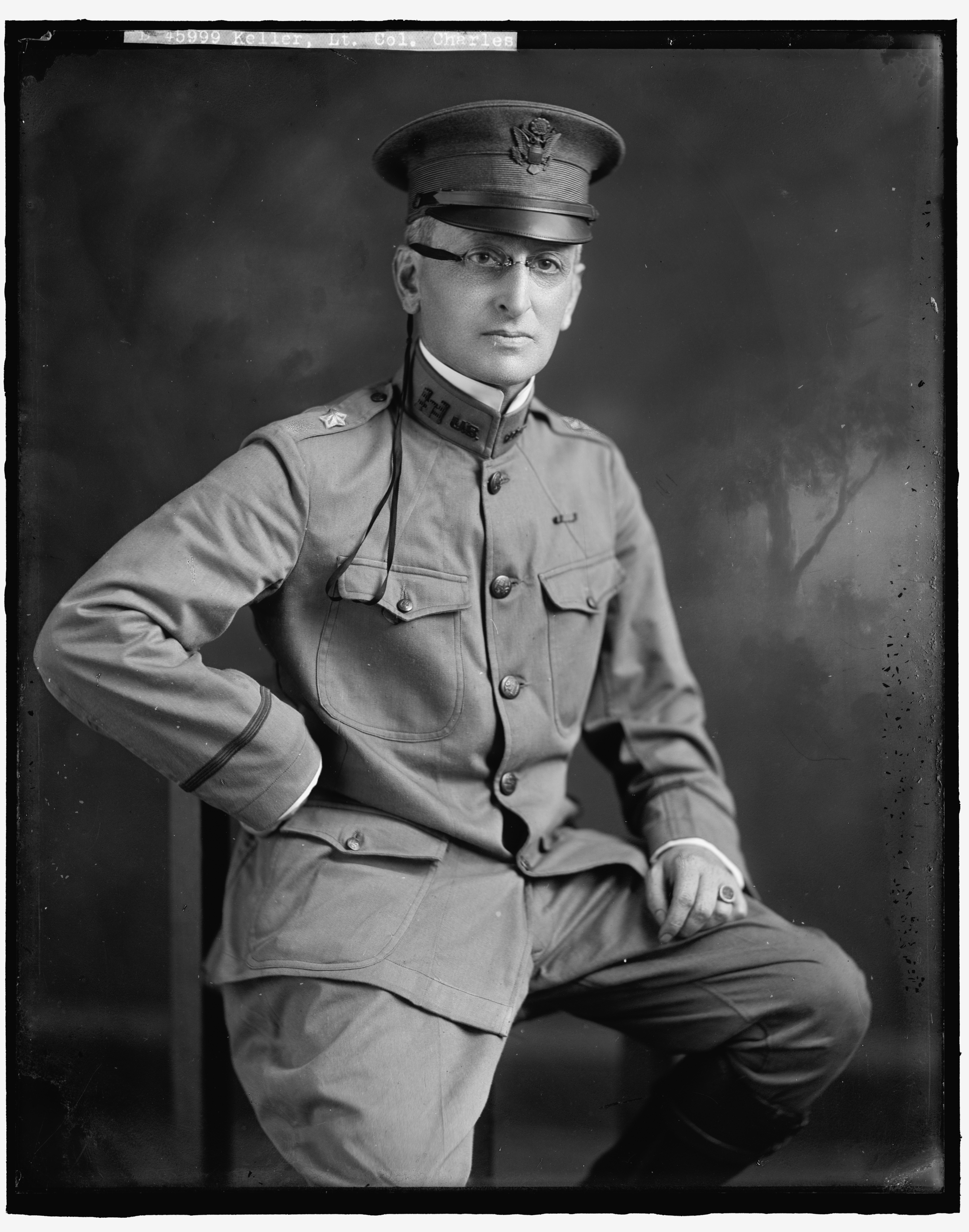
Keller during World War I.

From March 1918 to June 1919, Keller held the temporary rank of brigadier general and served as deputy chief engineer for the American Expeditionary Forces. His promotion to colonel became permanent in September 1919. From 1919 to 1921, he served as a Resident Member of Board of Engineers for Rivers and Harbors. From 1921 to 1923, he served as engineer commissioner for the District of Columbia. In October 1923, he retired from the army with the rank of Colonel and was later advanced to Brigadier General in June 1930.

In November 1940, he was recalled to active duty to serve as district engineer for Chicago, Illinois, until October 1943. In November 1943, he retired for a second time.

When he retired in 1943 he was 75 years old, the oldest Army officer to serve on active duty during World War II.

== Post military service ==
He worked for the Byllesby Engineering and Management Corporation serving as an engineering consultant and later principal assistant vice president in charge of engineering. He later became the director and president of one of its operating subsidiaries. From 1935 to 1938 he served as the director of Standard Gas & Electric Company.

== Personal life ==
In 1897, Keller married Frances Rosenfield and they had two sons, Ira C. and Charles Jr. Both of his sons would go on to serve in the military. After retirement, he lived in Mundelein, Illinois.

== Death ==
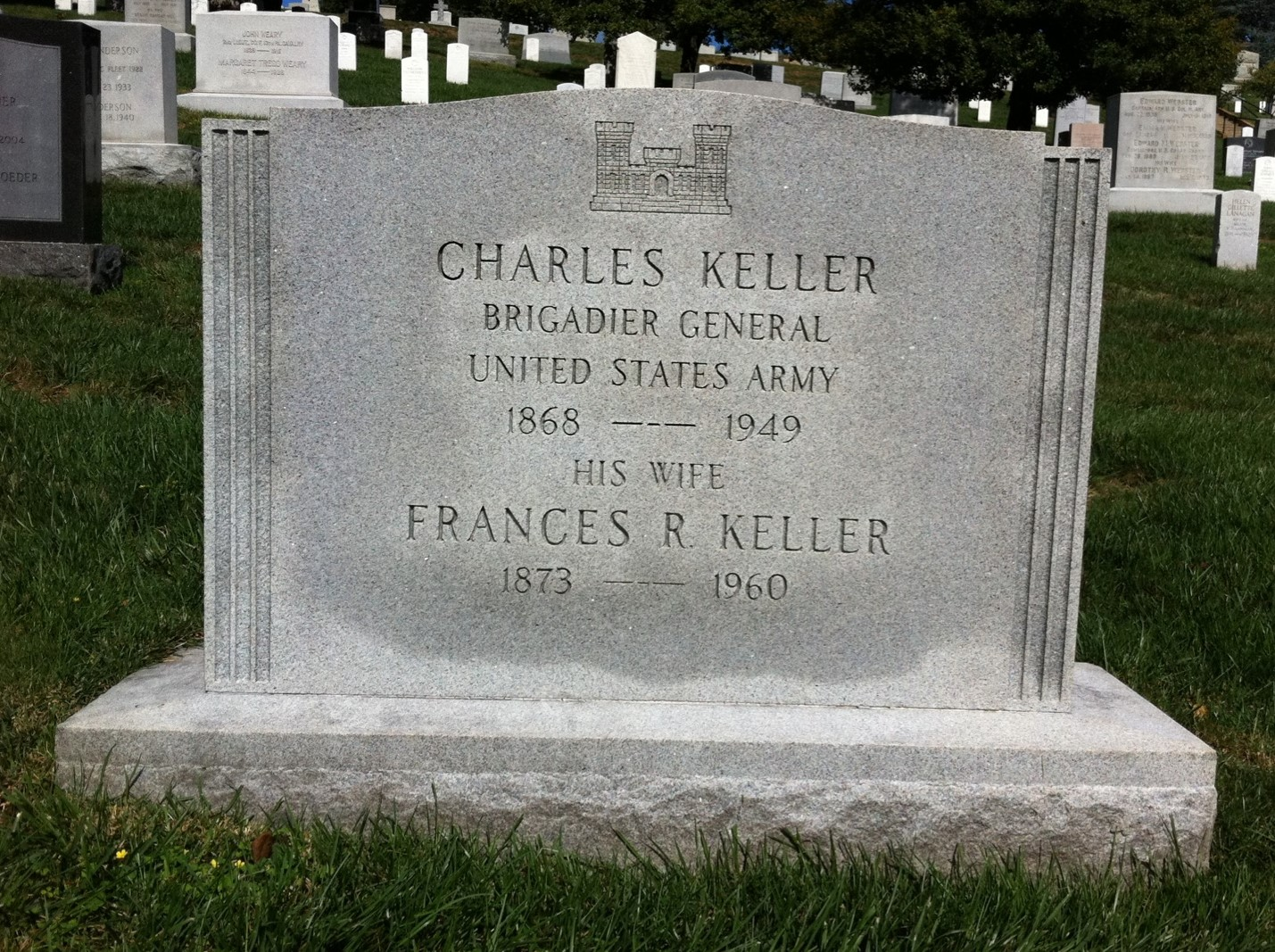
Grave of Keller at Arlington National Cemetery

Keller died on September 16, 1949, in Coronado, California, and his ashes were interred at Arlington National Cemetery in Arlington, Virginia on September 29, 1949.

== Awards and decorations ==
For his service in the First World War he was decorated with the Army Distinguished Service Medal and the French Legion of Honour. After his second retirement he was decorated with the Legion of Merit for his service in the Second World War.
