= Charles Willauer Kutz =

American brigadier general (1870–1951)

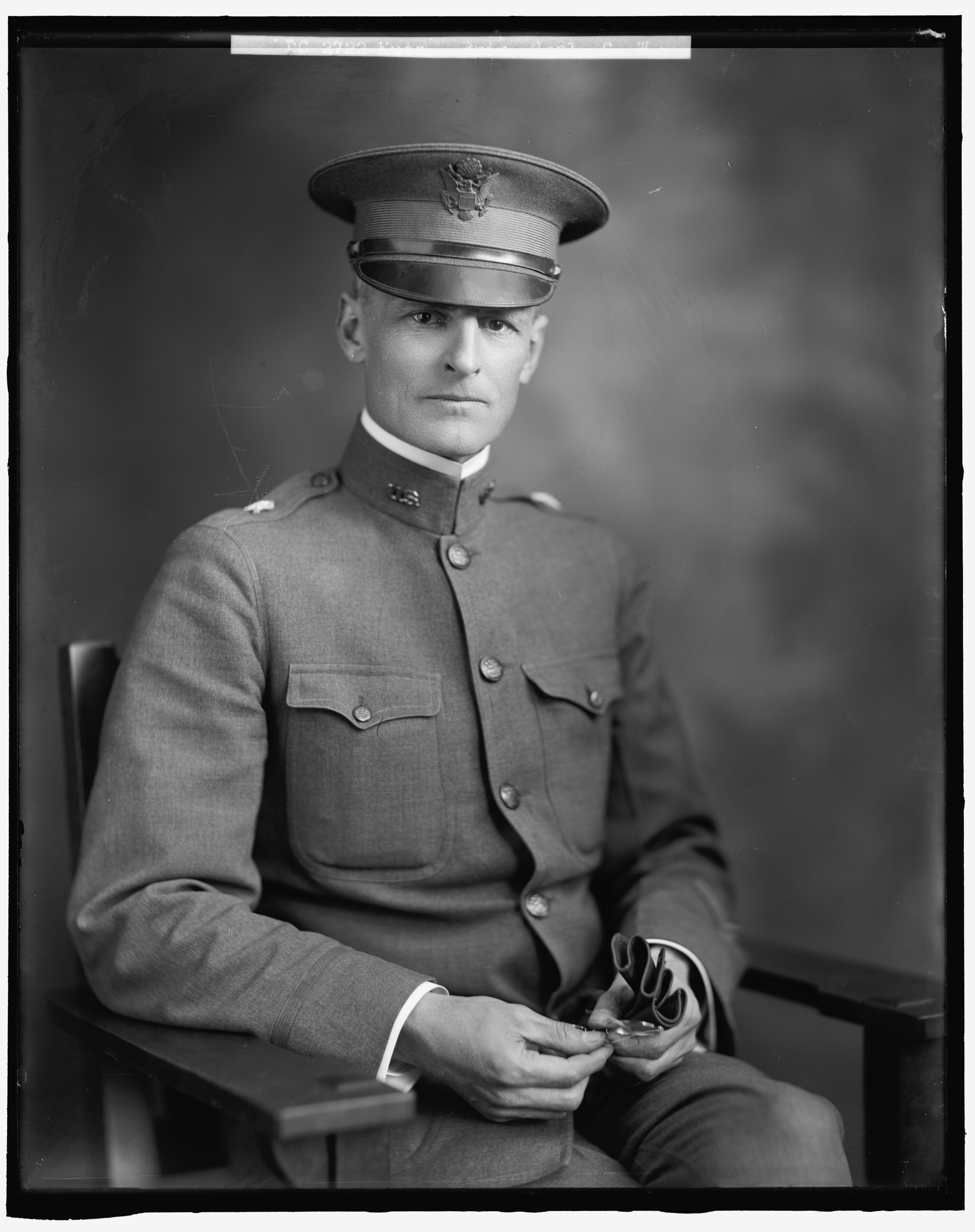
- Born: October 14, 1870; Reading, Pennsylvania, US
- Died: January 25, 1951 (aged 80); Washington, DC, US
- Burial place: Arlington National Cemetery
- Education: United States Military Academy; United States Army Engineer School

Engineering Commissioner of the Board of Commissioners of Washington, D.C.
- In office May 20, 1941 – September 25, 1945
- President: Franklin D. Roosevelt
- Preceded by: Lt. Col. David McCoach, Jr
- Succeeded by: Brig. Gen. Gordon R. Young

Engineering Commissioner of the Board of Commissioners of Washington, D.C.
- In office December 18, 1918 – October 6, 1921
- President: Woodrow Wilson
- Preceded by: Brig. Gen. John George David Knight
- Succeeded by: Col. Charles Keller

Acting President of the Board of Commissioners of Washington, D.C.
- In office September 17, 1920 – September 25, 1920
- President: Herbert Hoover
- Preceded by: Louis Brownlow
- Succeeded by: John Thilman Hendrick

Engineering Commissioner of the Board of Commissioners of Washington, D.C.
- In office October 31, 1914 – July 16, 1917
- President: Woodrow Wilson
- Preceded by: Lt. Col. Chester Harding
- Succeeded by: Brig. Gen. John George David Knight
- Spouse: Elizabeth Randolph Keim
- Children: Emily Randolph Kutz Bingham, Marian Elizabeth Kutz Ross, Charles Randolph Kutz
- Military career
- Allegiance: United States
- Branch: Army
- Service years: 1889–1929, 1941–1946
- Rank: Brigadier General
- Unit: 13th Engineer Railway Regiment
- Commands: 3rd Engineers
- Conflicts: World War I
- Awards: Croix de Guerre with Palm; Officer of the Legion of Honour
- Memorials: Kutz Memorial Bridge

Charles Willauer Kutz (October 14, 1870, in Reading, Pennsylvania – January 25, 1951, in Washington, D.C.) was an American brigadier general in the Army Corps of Engineers and the longest serving District of Columbia Engineer Commissioner in the history of the position. In 1920, he served as acting president of the board of commissioners, the chief executive position in the district, for one week – he was the only engineer commissioner to do so. For 12 days in March 1921, he was the only commissioner on the board, and its de facto leader.

== Early life and education ==
Charles Kutz was born in Reading, Pennsylvania, on October 14, 1870. His father Allen Kutz had been a first lieutenant in the Pennsylvania Volunteers during the Civil War and had fought at Antietam. His father died when he was only two years old, and Kutz had to get through school while working at a local bank from the age of 10. He was able to get into West Point via a competitive examination.

== Military and political career ==
In June 1889, he enrolled at the United States Military Academy and graduated number two of fifty-one in the class of 1893. He was commissioned additional second lieutenant in the Corps of Engineers and then went to the Engineer School of Application at the Fort at Willets Point for the special course in engineering, graduating in 1896.

Kutz rose in the ranks from lieutenant to major. He was stationed at various locations throughout the United States, including Baltimore, MD; Portland, ME; Washington, DC and Seattle, WA. Main tasks were, among other things, the maintenance of the waterways and ports, and the construction of military facilities. From October 1906 to June 1908, he was an instructor of Practical Military Engineering at West Point. Between 1911 and 1914, Kutz was stationed in the Philippines.

In 1914, Kutz became the military civil engineer member of the three-person board of commissioners that governed the city of Washington. He concurrently became chairman of the newly formed Public Utilities Commission. In 1917, shortly after being promoted to colonel, he was ordered to France for duty with the American Expeditionary Force in the First World War. After arriving in France he became assistant to the chief engineer of the 13th Engineer Railway Regiment. He was promoted to brigadier general, National Army, in June 1918 and assigned as assistant chief of staff, Services of Supply. In July, he left France and took command of Camp Humphries, the main training ground for officers of the engineering corps. In October 1918, he was again appointed the engineer commissioner of the District of Columbia Board of Commissioners, and served until 1921. In 1920, he served as its acting chairman for a week. His biggest contribution during his second term was as the first chairman of the District Zoning Commission, that was created in 1920. He was responsible for the zoning of the district into use, area and heights districts.

After leaving the board of commissioners, he was division engineer, Central Division, at Cincinnati, Ohio, from 1921 to 1928, and from 1928 to 1929, he was department engineer of the Hawaiian Department, and commanding officer of the 3rd Engineers. He retired as a colonel in November 1929. His rank was restored in June 1930.

In March 1941, he was called out of retirement and again made engineering commissioner of the District of Columbia by President Roosevelt.

After his second retirement from active duty in February 1946, he became a consulting engineer to the Sanitary District of Chicago and to the Minister of Works of Venezuela for the Maracaibo Bar Commission on the matter of providing a stable and ample deep water entrance to the oil port of Maracaibo.

Kutz was a member of the American Society of Civil Engineers and the Army and Navy Club.

== Personal life ==
Kutz married Elizabeth Randolph Keim on June 25, 1895. He had three children, Emily Randolph Bingham; Marian Elizabeth Ross, whose husband Lewis Tenney Ross, was also a general; and Colonel Charles Randolph Kutz, who served in Washington in the Army General Staff. He had five grandchildren including First Lieut. Tenney Kutz Ross, who was killed in action in Korea in November 1950.

== Death and legacy ==
He died on January 25, 1951, at St. Elizabeths Hospital in Washington and was buried in Arlington National Cemetery.

In 1954, the Independence Avenue bridge over the Tidal Basin was renamed the Kutz Bridge in his honor.
