= Independence Avenue (Washington, D.C.) =

Major east-west street in Washington, D.C.

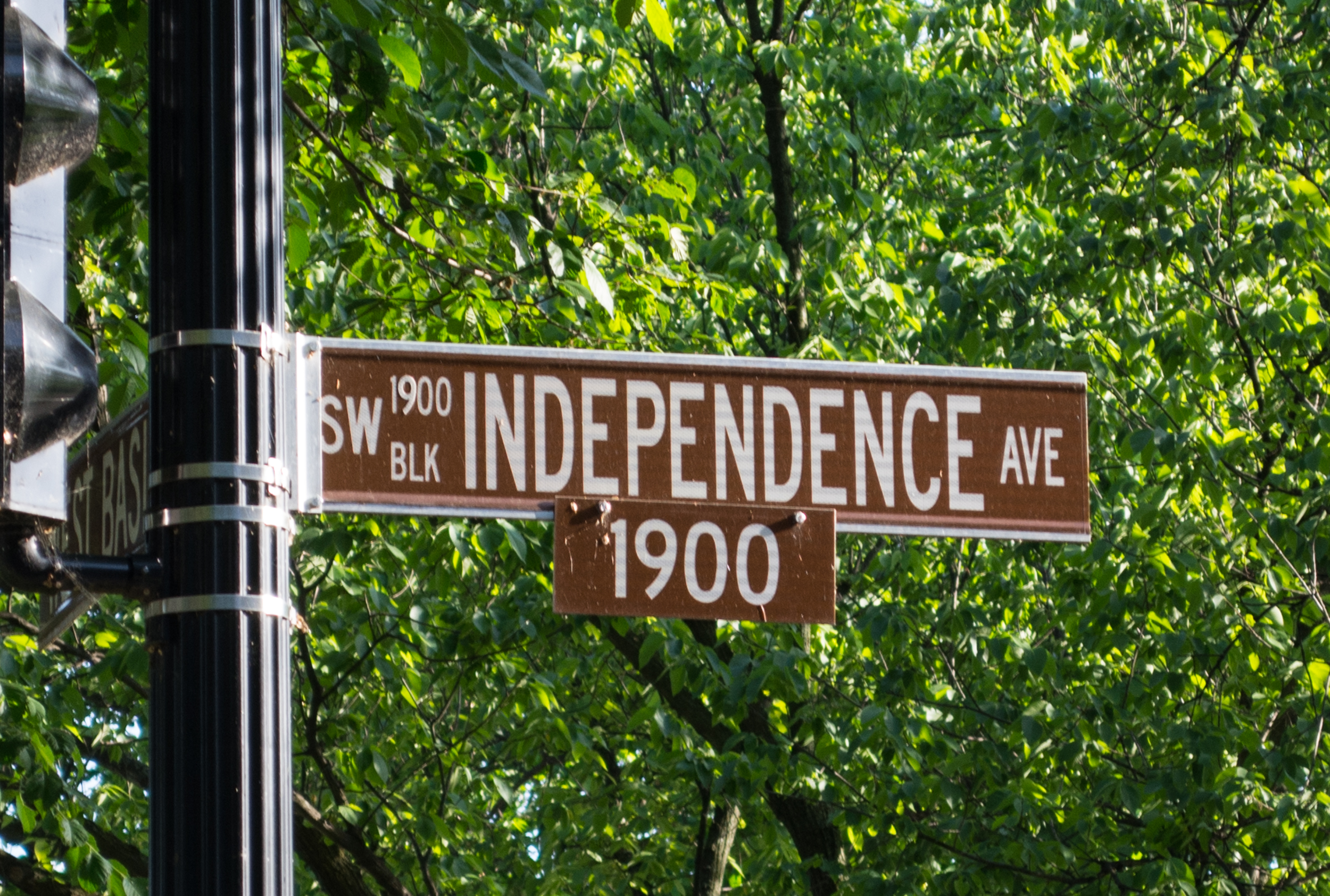
- Street sign at 1900 Independence Avenue SW
- Former name: B Street
- Maintained by: DDOT
- Location: Washington, D.C., U.S.
- West end: Ohio Drive SW
- Major junctions: Maine Avenue SW; 14th Street SW; Washington Avenue SW; Pennsylvania Avenue SE; Massachusetts Avenue SE
- East end: East Capitol Street (Whitney Young Memorial Bridge)

Construction
- Commissioned: 1791
- Completion: 1941

Independence Avenue is a major east–west street in the southwest and southeast quadrants of Washington, D.C., running just south of the United States Capitol. Originally named South B Street, Independence Avenue SW was constructed between 1791 and 1823. Independence Avenue SE was constructed in pieces as residential development occurred east of the Capitol and east of the Anacostia River. Independence Avenue received its current name after Congress renamed the street in 1934.

Independence Avenue SW originally had its western terminus at 14th Street SW, but was extended west to Ohio Drive SW between 1941 and 1942. The government of the District of Columbia renamed the portion of the road in the southeast quadrant of the city, west of the Anacostia River, in 1950. Independence Avenue SE encircles the southern end of the former RFK Stadium before ending at East Capitol Street near the Whitney Young Memorial Bridge.

== History ==
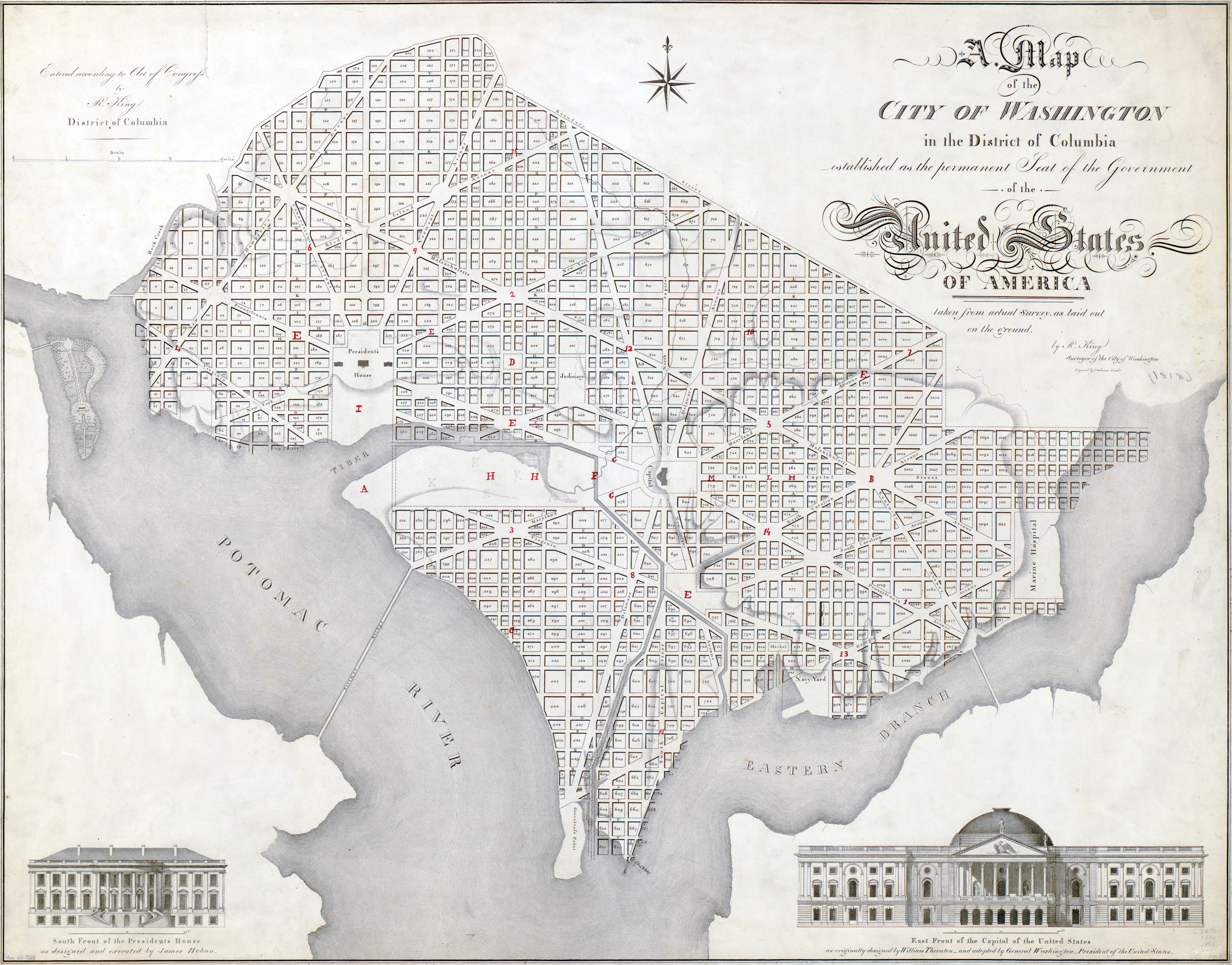
Map of the District of Columbia in 1818, showing the original terminus of South B Street

In the District of Columbia's Cartesian coordinate system street-naming system, Independence Avenue was originally known as South B Street. Construction on the street began sometime after 1791. By October 1803, it existed definitively between New Jersey Avenue and 1st Street East, and in 1809 it was opened between New Jersey Avenue and Pennsylvania Avenue. By 1816, the entire length of the avenue appears to have been opened. At the time, South B Street's western terminus was on the shore of the Potomac River, which at the time was located where 14th Street NW is now.

After terrible flooding inundated much of downtown Washington, D.C., in 1881, Congress ordered the United States Army Corps of Engineers to dredge a deep channel in the Potomac to lessen the chance of flooding. Congress also ordered that the dredged material be used to fill in what remained of the Tiber Creek estuary and build up much of the land near the White House and along Pennsylvania Avenue NW, by nearly 6 feet (1.8 m) to form a kind of levee. This "reclaimed land", which today includes West Potomac Park, East Potomac Park, the Tidal Basin, was largely complete by 1890, and designated Potomac Park by Congress in 1897. Congress first appropriated money for the beautification of the reclaimed land in 1902, which led to the planting of sod, bushes, and trees; grading and paving of sidewalks, bridle paths, and driveways; and the installation of water, drainage, and sewage pipes. But South B Street was not extended through the newly reclaimed land.

In 1925, Congress authorized the construction of Arlington Memorial Bridge. The legislation specified that North B Street be treated as a major approach to Arlington Memorial Bridge. The National Capital Park and Planning Commission approved the significant widening of North B Street into a ceremonial avenue. On February 25, 1931, President Herbert Hoover signed legislation which renamed North B Street as Constitution Avenue.

Planning for the creation of a similar ceremonial avenue to take the place of South B Street began in 1930. That year, the National Capital Park and Planning Commission (NCPPC) advocated turning the roadway into a much-widened ceremonial avenue as a counterpart to North B Street. The NCPPC proposed extending South B Street west via a bridge over the Tidal Basin as a means of alleviating the traffic congestion that occurred after the closure of 13th Street NW south of Constitution Avenue. The following year, the NCPPC proposed widening South B Street to 60 feet (18 m) between New Jersey Avenue SE and 12th Street SW. Between 12th and 14th Streets SW, the street would be 80 feet (24 m) wide, to accommodate the piers supporting the planned pedestrian skyways linking the United States Department of Agriculture headquarters building with the new United States Department of Agriculture South Building. All along the route, the north curb would remain in place, while the south curb moved to accommodate the new widths. The NCPPC had already won the support of the Architect of the Capitol for the plan, which agreed in 1930 to move the new House office building to the south in order to accommodate the wider avenue.

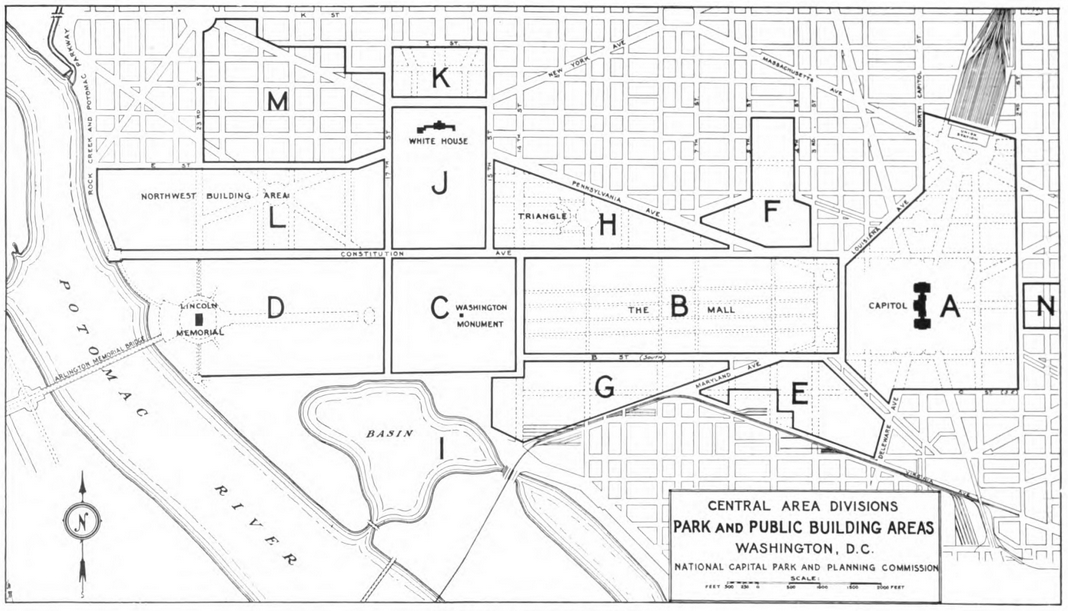
Planning map of the National Mall in 1932, showing the western terminus of South B Street still at 14th Street SW

The renaming of North B Street and the actions of the NCPPC encouraged local citizens to seek to rename South B Street as well. In April 1932, the Federation of Citizens Associations of Washington, D.C., petitioned Congress to rename South B Street "Washington Avenue" between the Washington Monument grounds and Pennsylvania Avenue SE. The idea was conceived by the federation's past president, Fred A. Emery, who observed that no major thoroughfare in the city commemorated George Washington (whose bicentennial birth was being celebrated that year). But no action was taken in the 72nd United States Congress. Instead, Senate Joint Resolution 258 was introduced Arthur Capper (R-Kansas) in the United States Senate to change the name to Independence Avenue. The Senate Committee on the District of Columbia favorably reported the bill on February 28, 1933. But Congress adjourned on March 3 without further action.

The NCPPC, however, did not give up on the idea. In November 1933, it approved changing the width of South B Street between 12th and 14th Streets SW to 80 feet (24 m), which helped cement in place its plan for a "future Independence Avenue". At its meeting on January 18, 1934, it re-emphasized its support for the street's renaming.

Congress acted swiftly to rename the street. On February 2, 1934, Senator James J. Davis (R-Pennsylvania) submitted S. 194 to accomplish this purpose. The full Senate passed the bill on February 6. The bill went to the United States House of Representatives, where the House Committee on the District of Columbia reported the bill favorably on March 10. However, the bill was held up (along with all other D.C.-related legislation) as the House debated the Reciprocal Tariff Act. Worried that the bill might stall, the Washington Board of Trade endorsed the legislation on March 30. On April 5, Representative Mary T.Norton (D-New Jersey), chair of the House District of Columbia Committee, broke the logjam after appealing to the House leadership and won a full day's debate on all D.C.-related bills, including the South B Street naming bill. The full House passed the bill April 9, and President Franklin D. Roosevelt signed it into law on April 13, 1934.

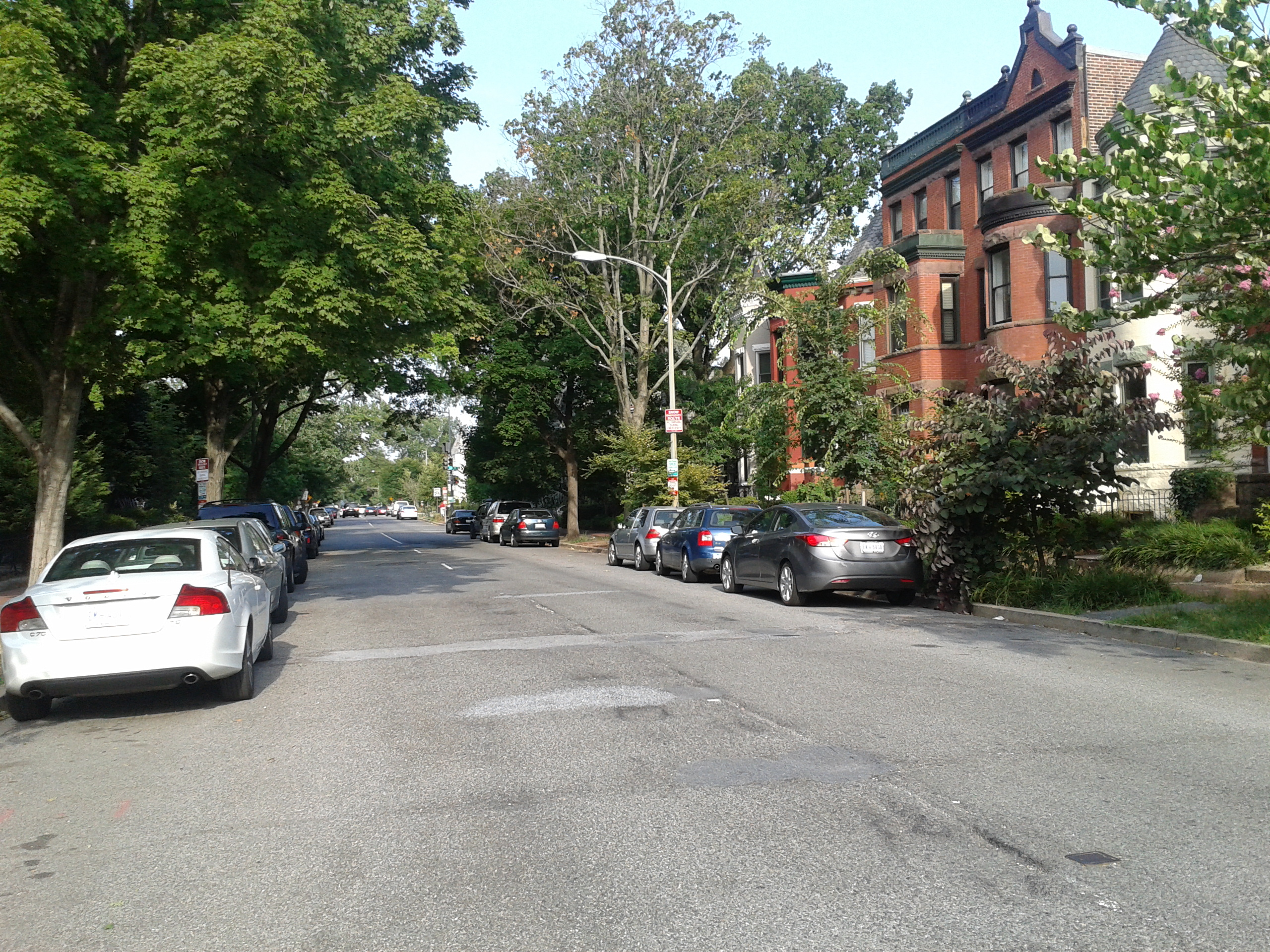
Independence Avenue on Capitol Hill, where it is a residential street for some of its length

Independence Avenue was finally extended westward through West Potomac Park in 1941 and 1942. For a decade, the NCPPC's proposal to extend the avenue westward had been opposed by the United States Department of the Interior, which opposed use of parkland for roads. There was also concern that the road would interfere with the Tidal Basin, which served as a flushing system of the downtown sewer network. But in October 1941, United States Secretary of the Interior Harold L. Ickes removed his opposition to the extension, citing the need to accommodate defense workers needing to access the national capital. The NCPPC voted on October 17, 1941, to extend the avenue west to the Potomac River. The agency was still unsure, however, whether to fill in the Tidal Basin's north bay, bridge it, or build a causeway. A bridge over the north bay of the Tidal Basin was the solution, and construction on the new Kutz Memorial Bridge began in June 1942.

The 1934 legislation only renamed B Street SW. B Street SE, both east and west of the Anacostia River, retained its original name. This proved immensely confusing for motorists, as the street changed its named east of South Capitol Street. In 1950, the D.C. Commissioners voted to change the name of B Street SE between South Capitol Street and the Anacostia River to Independence Avenue SE. B Street SE east of the Anacostia River continues to retain its original designation.

== Route and landmarks ==
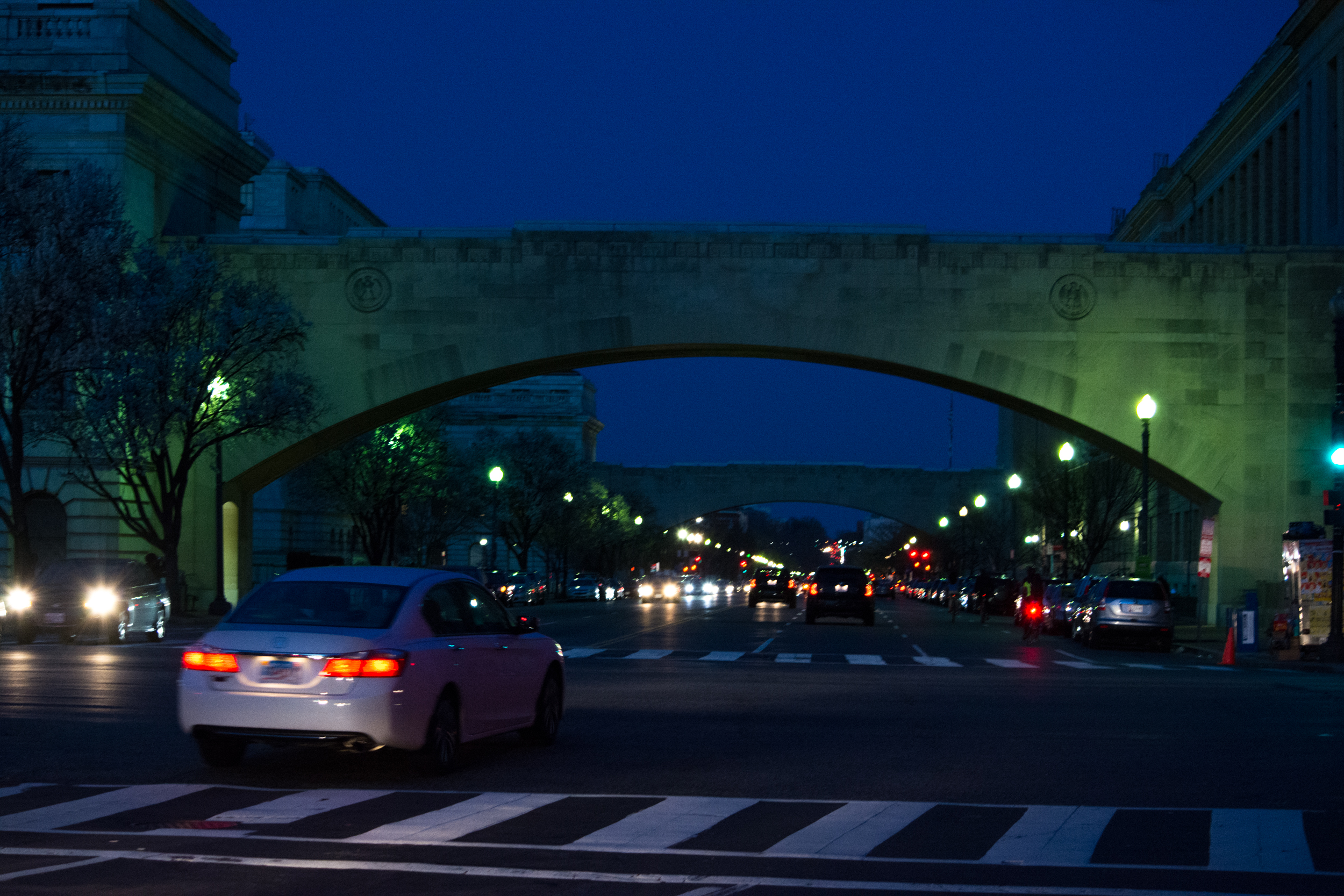
Standing on 15th Street NW, looking east at night along Independence Avenue SW

The western terminus of Independence Avenue is south of the Lincoln Memorial at the intersection of Ohio Drive SW and 23rd Street SW. The street contains three lanes of traffic in each direction, and eastbound and westbound lanes are divided by a 55-foot (17 m) grassy median. The John Ericsson National Memorial is located southwest to this terminus. Going eastward, Independence Avenue passes through West Potomac Park, creating an informal boundary to the National Mall. The Korean War Veterans Memorial is adjacent to the avenue's north edge about 600 feet (180 m) east of the terminus. After passing West Basin Drive SW, motorists can see the Martin Luther King, Jr. Memorial adjacent to the roadway to the south and the District of Columbia War Memorial adjacent to the roadway to the north.

As Independence Avenue SW approaches the Tidal Basin, the westbound lanes curve north toward 17th Street SW to avoid a bay in the Basin. The John Paul Jones Memorial stands where 17th Street SW meets Independence Avenue SW. The eastbound lanes cross the Tidal Basin via the Kutz Bridge. Small off-ramps allow westbound traffic to return eastbound, and eastbound traffic to return westbound, essentially ringing the Tidal Basin bay with roadways. East of the Tidal Basin, Maine Avenue SW joins westbound Independence Avenue. An off-ramp allows eastbound Independence Avenue traffic to access Maine Avenue SW, and then an unnamed bridge creates a grade separation between elevated Independence Avenue and entrenched Maine Avenue. Both lanes of Independence Avenue curve gently through this area before moving northward to avoid the Sidney Yates Federal Building (the red brick, Romanesque Revival headquarters of the United States Forest Service). The two lanes merge into a single street with no median at Raoul Wallenberg Place SW (e.g., 14th Street SW) before curving slightly south to straighten into a formal east–west aligned ceremonial avenue.

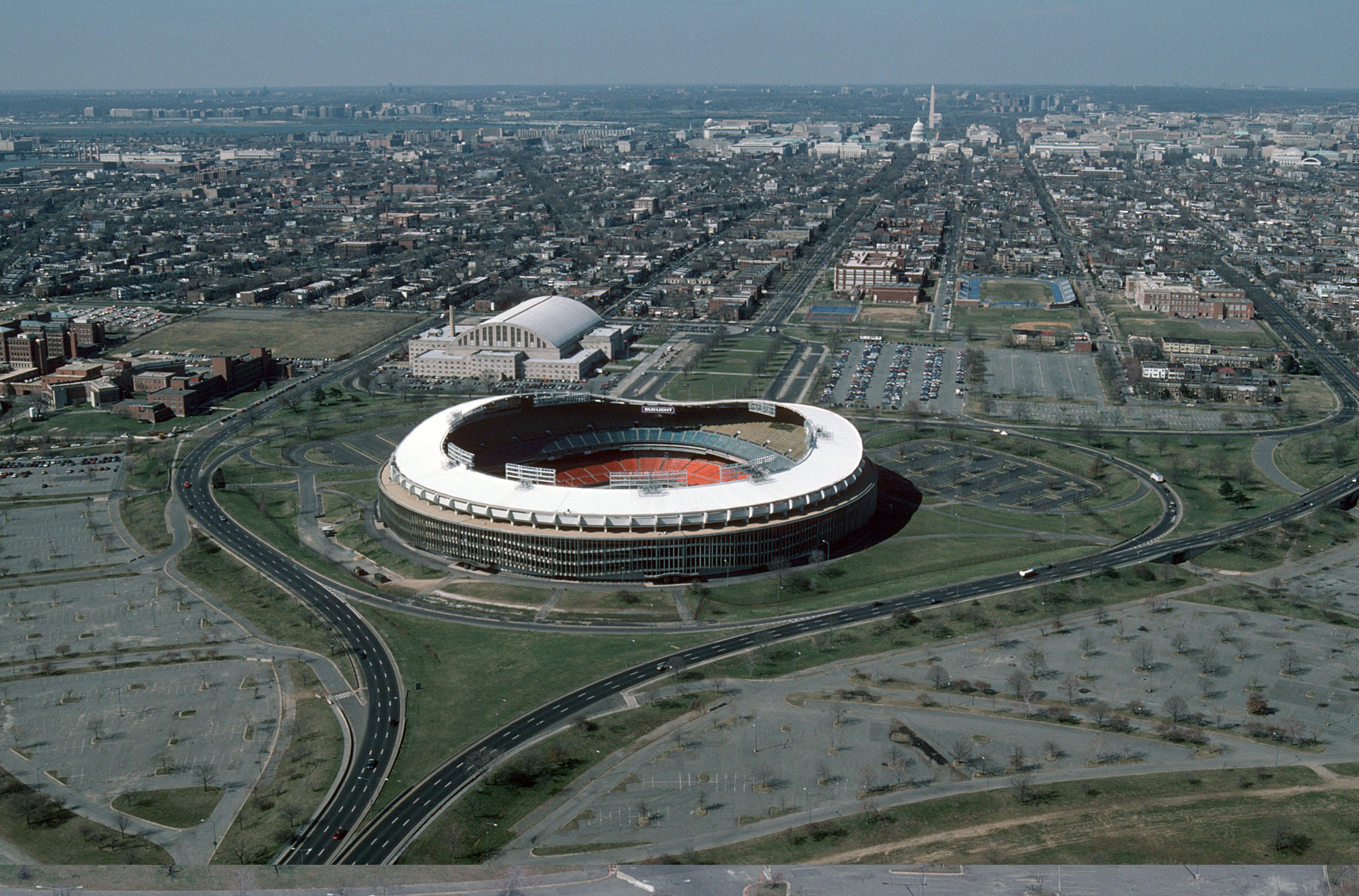
Independence Avenue SE can be seen to the left of Robert F. Kennedy Memorial Stadium and the D.C. Armory in this 1988 photograph.

Between 14th Street SW and 2nd Street SW, Independence Avenue is lined with museums and federal office buildings. On the north side of the street (west to east) are the U.S. Department of Agriculture's headquarters (the Jamie L. Whitten Federal Building), the Freer Gallery of Art and Arthur M. Sackler Gallery (both art museums belonging to the Smithsonian Institution), the Smithsonian Institution Building, the National Museum of African Art, the Hirshhorn Museum and Sculpture Garden, the National Air and Space Museum, the National Museum of the American Indian, and the United States Botanic Garden. On the south side of the street (west to east) are the Department of Agriculture's South Building, the James V. Forrestal Building (headquarters of the United States Department of Energy), the Wilbur Wright Federal Building, and the Orville Wright Federal Building (headquarters of the Federal Aviation Administration), the Wilbur J. Cohen Federal Building (occupied by the United States Department of Health and Human Services [HHS]), and the Hubert H. Humphrey Building (headquarters of HHS).

At 2nd Street SW, Independence Avenue SW meets Washington Avenue SW, a major thoroughfare providing access to Interstate 395 and South Capitol Street.

Independence Avenue SW/SE forms the southern boundary of the grounds of the United States Capitol. The Capitol is to the north of the street, while the Cannon, Longworth, and Rayburn House Office Buildings are to the south. Past the Capitol, Independence Avenue SE passes between the Library of Congress' Thomas Jefferson Building (north) and James Madison Memorial Building (south). The last major building along the avenue is the Library of Congress' John Adams Building (north), where Independence Avenue SE has a junction with Pennsylvania Avenue SE.

The wide, ceremonial Independence Avenue SE narrows to become a traditional residential street east of 2nd Street SE. There is a major intersection with Massachusetts Avenue SE between 14th and 15th Street SE. After 19th Street SE, Independence Avenue SE passes to the south of the D.C. Armory. The roadway then curves south and northeast around the former Robert F. Kennedy Memorial Stadium. At its eastern terminus, Independence Avenue SE merges with East Capitol Street as it reaches the Whitney Young Memorial Bridge over the Anacostia River.

== Importance in the District of Columbia road network ==
Independence Avenue SW is a major commuting route, and carries very heavy automobile traffic during rush hour weekday mornings and evenings. At all other times, including weekends, it sees significant use by residents seeking to access Virginia via Arlington Memorial Bridge and by tour buses. From 23rd Street SW to Pennsylvania Avenue SE, Independence Avenue is part of the National Highway System.

== Bibliography ==
- Army Corps of Engineers (1918). Report of the Chief of Engineers. War Department Annual Reports, 1917. Vol. 2. Washington, D.C.: Government Printing Office.
- Burch, Samuel (1823). A Digest of the Laws of the Corporation of the City of Washington, to the First of June, 1823: With an Appendix, Containing the Acts of Cession from Maryland and Virginia, the Laws of the United States, Relating to the District of Columbia, the Building Regulations of Said City, Etc. Washington, D.C.: James Wilson.
- Bednar, Michael J. (2006). L'Enfant's Legacy: Public Open Spaces in Washington, D.C. Baltimore, Md.: Johns Hopkins University Press. ISBN 978-0-8018-8318-7.
- Corporation of the City of Washington (1805). Acts of the Corporation of the City of Washington: Passed by the Third Council. Washington, D.C.: A&G Way.
- Corporation of the City of Washington (1810). Acts of the Corporation of the City of Washington: Passed by the Eighth Council. Washington, D.C.: A&G Way.
- Gutheim, Frederick A.; Lee, Antoinette J. (2006). Worthy of the Nation: Washington, D.C., From L'Enfant to the National Capital Planning Commission. Baltimore, Md.: Johns Hopkins University Press. ISBN 978-0-8018-8328-6.
- National Capital Park and Planning Commission (1930). Annual Report: National Capital Parks and Planning Commission, 1930. Washington, D.C.: U.S. Government Printing Office. hdl:2027/mdp.39015073422266.
- National Capital Park and Planning Commission (1931). Annual Report: National Capital Parks and Planning Commission for the Fiscal Year Ended June 30, 1931. Washington, D.C.: U.S. Government Printing Office. hdl:2027/uc1.$b601607.
- National Capital Park and Planning Commission (1932). Annual Report: National Capital Parks and Planning Commission for the Fiscal Year Ended June 30, 1932. Washington, D.C.: U.S. Government Printing Office. hdl:2027/uc1.$b601607.
- Office of the Clerk (1934). Calendars of the United States House of Representatives and History of Legislation. 73d Congress. Washington, D.C.: U.S. Government Printing Office.
- Tindall, William (1914). Standard History of the City of Washington From a Study of the Original Sources. Knoxville, Tenn.: H.W. Crew & Co.
- United States Congress (1932). United States Congressional Serial Set. Washington, D.C.: U.S. Government Printing Office.
- United States Congress (1934). United States Congressional Serial Set, Issue 9775. Washington, D.C.: U.S. Government Printing Office.
