= Kutz Memorial Bridge =

Bridge in Washington, D.C., U.S.

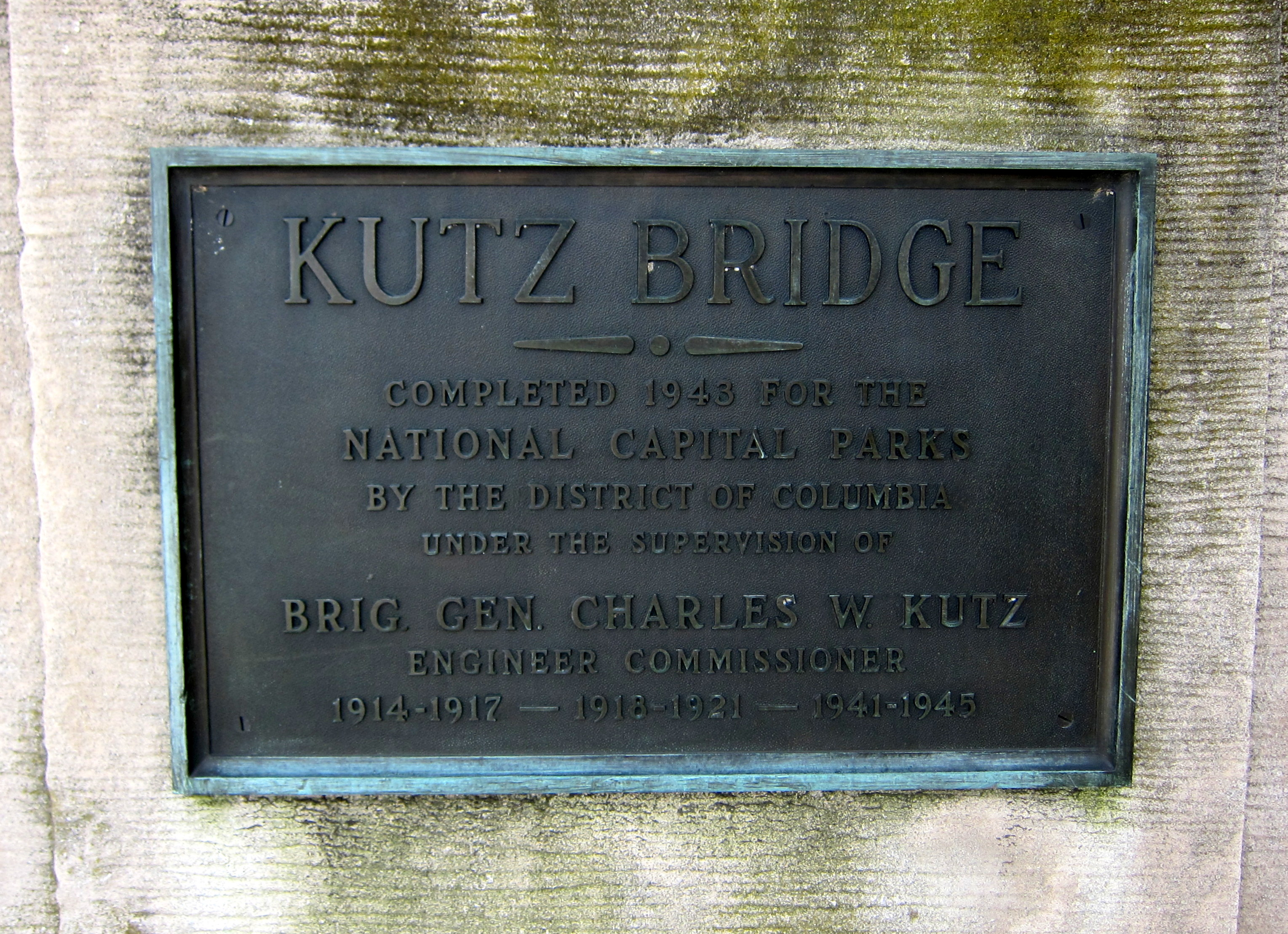
- Coordinates: 38°53′N 77°02′W
- Carries: Independence Avenue
- Crosses: Tidal Basin
- Locale: Washington, D.C., United States
- Named for: Charles W. Kutz

History
- Architect: Paul Philippe Cret
- Constructed by: Alexander & Repass Company
- Construction end: 1943

Location
- Interactive map of Kutz Memorial Bridge

The Kutz Memorial Bridge is a bridge that carries Independence Avenue across the Tidal Basin in Washington, D.C., in the United States. Architect Paul Philippe Cret designed the multi-span plate girder bridge in 1941. The Alexander & Repass Company constructed the bridge, which the company completed in 1943.

The bridge's name commemorates Brigadier General Charles Willauer Kutz, who served as Commissioner of Engineering for the District of Columbia during the first half of the 20th century. Following alterations, the bridge was dedicated in 1954.

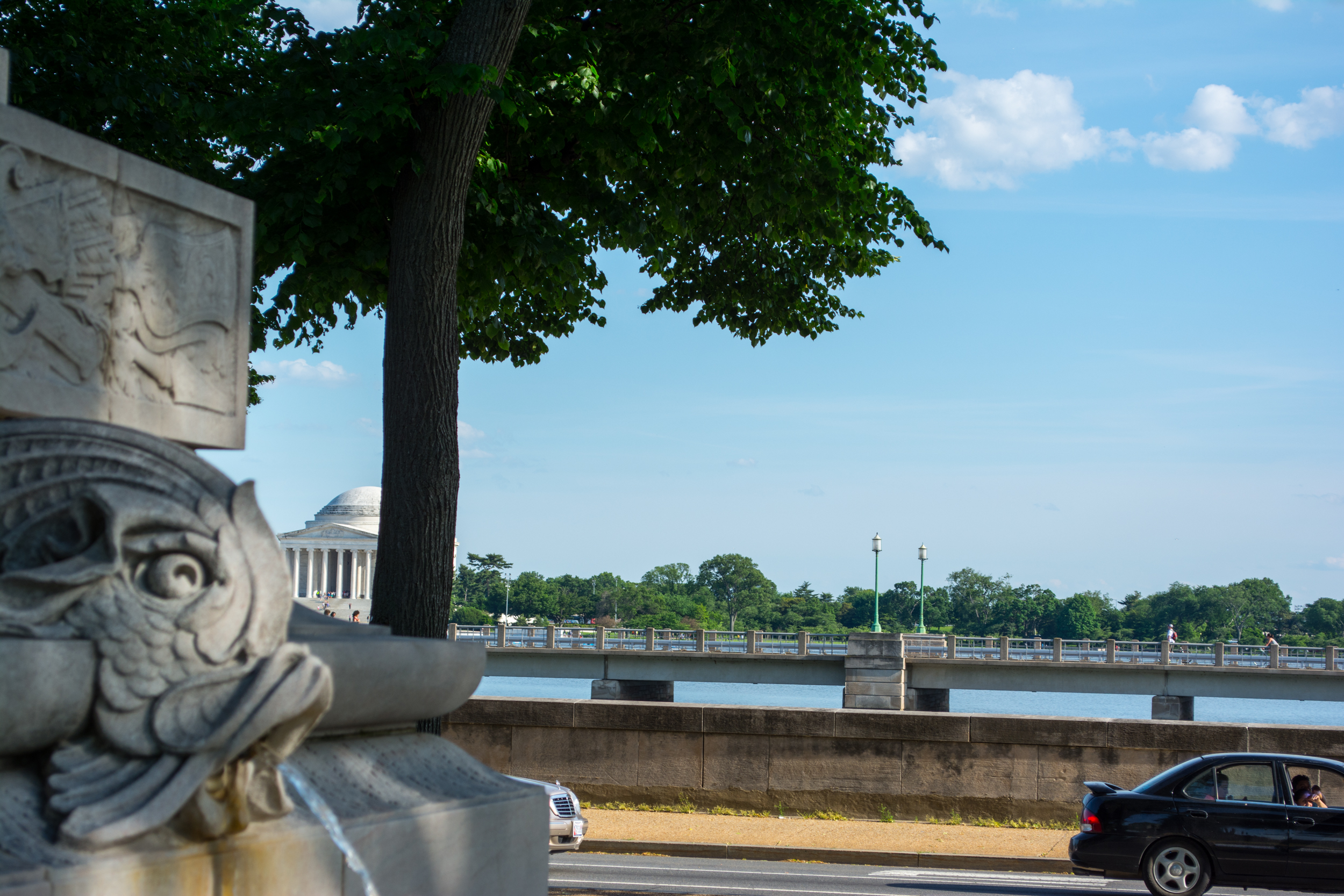
Kutz Memorial Bridge (May 2014)
