= Railway operations, American Expeditionary Forces =

Railway element of the American Expeditionary Forces during World War I

Railway operations
- Part of Services of Supply (S.O.S.)
- SOS shoulder insignia
- Operational scope: Base, intermediate, and advanced sections, S.O.S.
- Type: Engineer and Transportation
- Location: France
- Planned by: Quartermaster Corps
- Commanded by: Services of Supply
- Date: May 1917

Railway operations were originally established by the United States Army to provide support to France and Great Britain after the United States entered World War I. The Army organized and deployed different types of railway regiments and battalions. As operations progressed, the railway units were used to support the American Expeditionary Forces as well. U.S. rail regiments moved both troops and supplies for the AEF and for the allies from the seaports to the front.

== Organization ==
Organization began with a survey group established by Secretary of War Newton D. Baker and railway executive Samuel Morse Felton Jr. This group, led by William Barclay Parsons, examined docks and rail traffic and recommended a solution for the United States. After Parsons' group observed that the France's ports were inadequate, its rail system was carrying all the traffic it could bear, and its canals were blocked, it requested that engineers be sent to France. The Army sent nine railway regiments, all filled with volunteers from U. S. railways, as follows: five construction regiments, three operations regiments, and one shop regiment. Railway regiments typically consisted of two battalions of three companies each.

== Railway units ==
=== First deployments ===
- 11th Engineer Regiment (Railway) (standard gauge railway construction), organized at Fort Totten, New York in June 1917, moved to the port of embarkation, Hoboken, New Jersey in July 1917, overseas as S.O.S. troops from July 1917 to April 1919, moved to Camp Mills, New York in April 1919, demobilized at Camp Upton, New York in April 1919.
- 12th Engineer Regiment (standard gauge railway operation), organized at St. Louis, Missouri in May 1918, moved to Camp Gaillard, Missouri in June 1917 and to the port of embarkation, Hoboken, New Jersey in July 1917, overseas as S.O.S. troops from July 1917 to April 1919, moved to Camp Upton, New York in April 1919, demobilized at Camp Funston, Kansas in May 1919
- 13th Engineer Regiment (standard gauge railway operation), organized at Chicago, Illinois in July 1917, moved to the port of embarkation, Hoboken, New Jersey in July 1917, overseas as S.O.S. troops from July 1917 to April 1919, moved to the port of embarkation, Hoboken, New Jersey in July 1917, overseas as S.O.S. troops until April 1919, moved to Camp Mills, New York in April 1919, demobilized at Camp Grant, Illinois in May 1919.
- 14th Engineer Regiment (standard gauge railway operation), organized at Camp Rockingham, New Hampshire in June 1917, moved to the port of embarkation, Hoboken, New Jersey in July 1917, overseas as Army troops from July 1917 to April 1919, moved to Camp Devens, Massachusetts in April 1919, demobilized at Camp Devens in May 1919.
- 15th Engineer Regiment (standard gauge railway construction), organized at Oakmont, Pennsylvania in May 1917, moved to the port of embarkation, Hoboken, New Jersey in July 1917, overseas as Army troops from July 1917 to April 1919, moved to Camp Upton, New York in April 1919, demobilized at Camp Sherman, Ohio in May 1919.
- 16th Engineer Regiment (standard gauge railway construction), organized at Detroit, Michigan in May 1917, moved to the port of embarkation, Hoboken, New Jersey in August 1917, overseas as S.O.S. troops from August 1917 to April 1919, moved to Camp Upton, New York in April 1919, demobilized at Camp Custer, Michigan in May 1919.
- 17th Engineer Regiment (standard gauge railway construction), The Seventeenth Regiment of Railway Engineers was organized in Atlanta, Georgia, in the summer of 1917. The Regiment was primarily formed with railroad workers from the Southern states as well as the Midwest and was under the command of Col. John S. Atwell. The regiment trained at the Woodward lumber yard, outside of Atlanta, until they received their official orders to go abroad in mid-July 1917. On July 28, 1917, the 2,500 troops of the 12th and 17th Engineers boarded the H.M.S. Carmania in New York. The H.M.S. Carmania stopped in Halifax, Nova Scotia, to join other departing troop ships, before heading on to their final destination, Liverpool England. The Regiment arrived in Liverpool, England, on August 12, 1917. From Liverpool, they took the train south to the military camp at Borden. In August 1917, the Seventeenth Regiment of Railway Engineers sailed on the Northwestern Miller from Southampton, England, to Le Havre, France. From there, they traveled south by train. On August 19, the 17th Engineering Regiment arrived at their new camp outside St. Nazaire. The Regiment was charged with maintaining a standard gauge railroad service and helping in the construction of the American port in St. Nazaire, France.
  On March 11, 1919, the Regiment, under the command of Col. Clarence S. Coe, departed from St. Nazaire, France on the U.S.S. Susquehanna. They arrived in Hoboken, New Jersey, on March 25, 1919.
- 18th Engineer Regiment (standard gauge railway construction), organized at American Lake, Washington in May 1917, moved to the port of embarkation, Hoboken, New Jersey in August 1917, overseas as S.O.S. troops from August 1917 to April 1919, moved to Camp Mills, New York in April 1919, demobilized at Camp Lewis, Washington in May 1919.
- 19th Engineer Regiment (standard gauge railway shop), organized at Philadelphia, Pennsylvania in May 1917, moved to the port of embarkation, Hoboken, New Jersey in August 1917, overseas as S.O.S. troops from August 1917 until converted to the 19th Transportation Corps Regiment.

=== Later deployments ===
- 21st Engineer Regiment (light gauge railway operation), organized at Camp Grant, Illinois in December 1917, moved to the port of embarkation, Hoboken, New Jersey in December 1917, overseas as Army troops from December 1917 to June 1919, demobilized at Camp Devens, Massachusetts in June 1919.
- 22nd Engineer Regiment (light gauge railway construction), organized at Camp Sheridan, Alabama in March 1918, moved the port of embarkation, Hoboken, New Jersey in June 1918, overseas as Army troops from June 1918 to June 1919, moved to Camp Jackson, South Carolina in June 1919, demobilized at Camp Zachary Taylor, Kentucky in July 1919.
- 32nd Engineer Regiment (standard gauge railway construction), organized at Camp Grant, Illinois in January 1918, moved the port of embarkation, Hoboken, New Jersey in June 1918, overseas as S.O.S. troops from June 1918 to June 1919, moved to Camp Stuart, Virginia in June 1919, demobilized at Camp Grant, Illinois in June 1919.
- 35th Engineer Regiment (railway shop regiment), organized at Camp Grant, Illinois in October 1917, moved the port of embarkation, Hoboken, New Jersey in January 1918, overseas from January 1918 until converted to 35th Transportation Corps Regiment.
- 36th Engineer Regiment (railway transportation battalion)

== Operations ==
=== Existing services ===
France had six railway systems: the Etat, Nord, Est, Paris-Orleans, Paris-Lyon-Mediterranee, and Midi.

=== Track ===
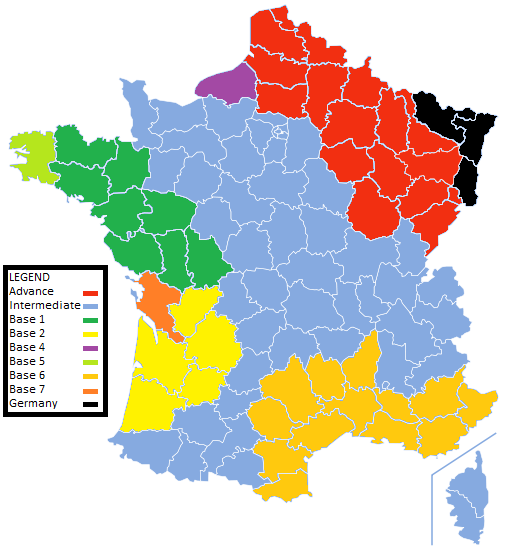
Sections of the SOS in France

Broad gauge (width between the rails) track in France was 4 feet 8.7 inches (1.44 m). Standard gauge in the United States was 4 feet 8.5 inches (1.44 m). The difference between the two in tenths of an inch was negligible and the wheels of U.S. locomotives and rolling stock did not have to be modified to be used.

=== Locomotives and Rolling stock ===
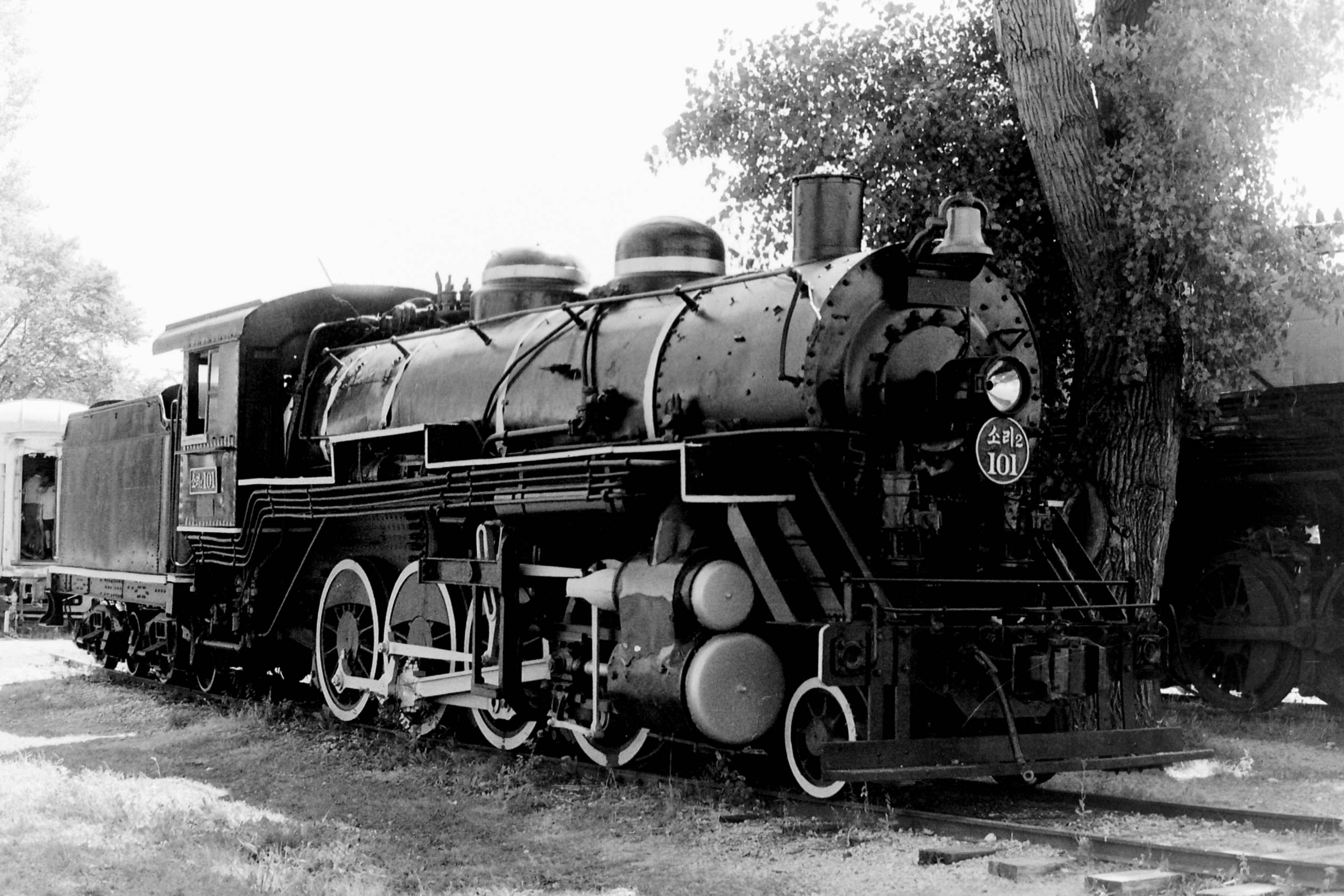
A 2-8-0 locomotive manufactured in 1916

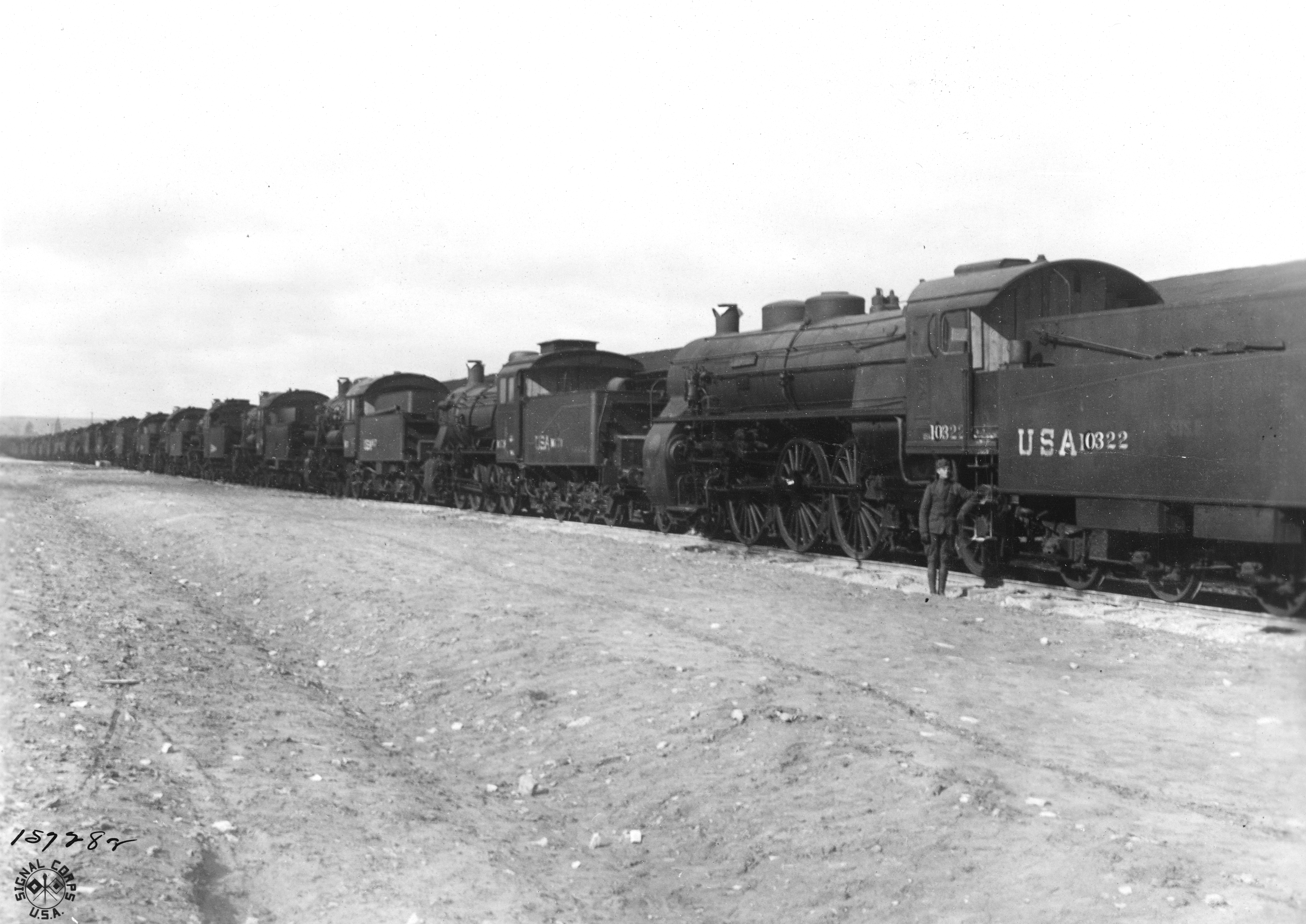
German locomotives turned over to the AEF, April 1919.

American rail equipment was larger than that of the French. The countries agreed that the size of U.S. locomotives used in France would have a traction force limited only by the clearances and load-bearing capacity of French railways and that cars would match the capacity of the locomotives. After two test runs proved the feasibility of air brakes, the French agreed to allow American cars to be equipped with those brakes, which the French rolling stock was not. Instead of American knuckle couplers, U.S. trains would be equipped with couplers and buffers used in France. American trains were limited to a length of 500 meters (1,600 ft); the limit was imposed by the length of French passing sidings.

The standard American locomotive in use was the 2-8-0 Consolidation type. More than 1600 of the Consolidation locomotives were assembled in France by U.S. mechanics; most were allocated to the AEF.

Almost twenty thousand American-made railway cars were received in France during the war and after the armistice. Car types included box cars, flat cars, gondola cars (high and low sided), tank cars, refrigerator cars, ballast cas and dump cars.

=== Facilities ===
- Railroad Repair Shops, Nevers, France

=== Routes ===
The American Expeditionary Forces were authorized to run their own trains operated by American crews on French rails from the ports to the advance section.
