= Rock Creek and Potomac Parkway Bridge near P Street =

- Coordinates: 38°55′N 77°03′W
- Locale: Washington D.C. U.S.

Characteristics
- Material: Concrete

History
- Construction end: 1936

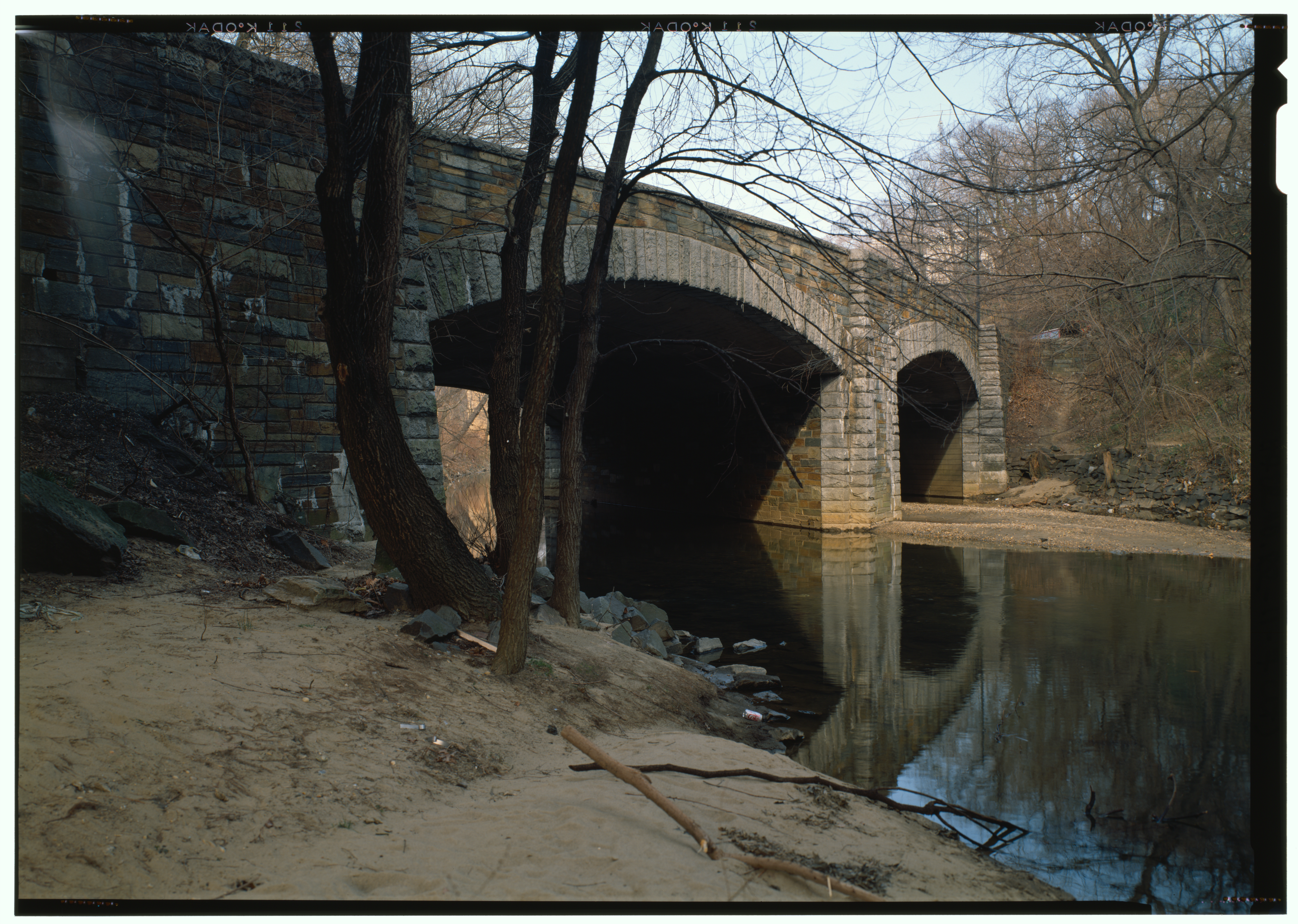
The bridge in 1989

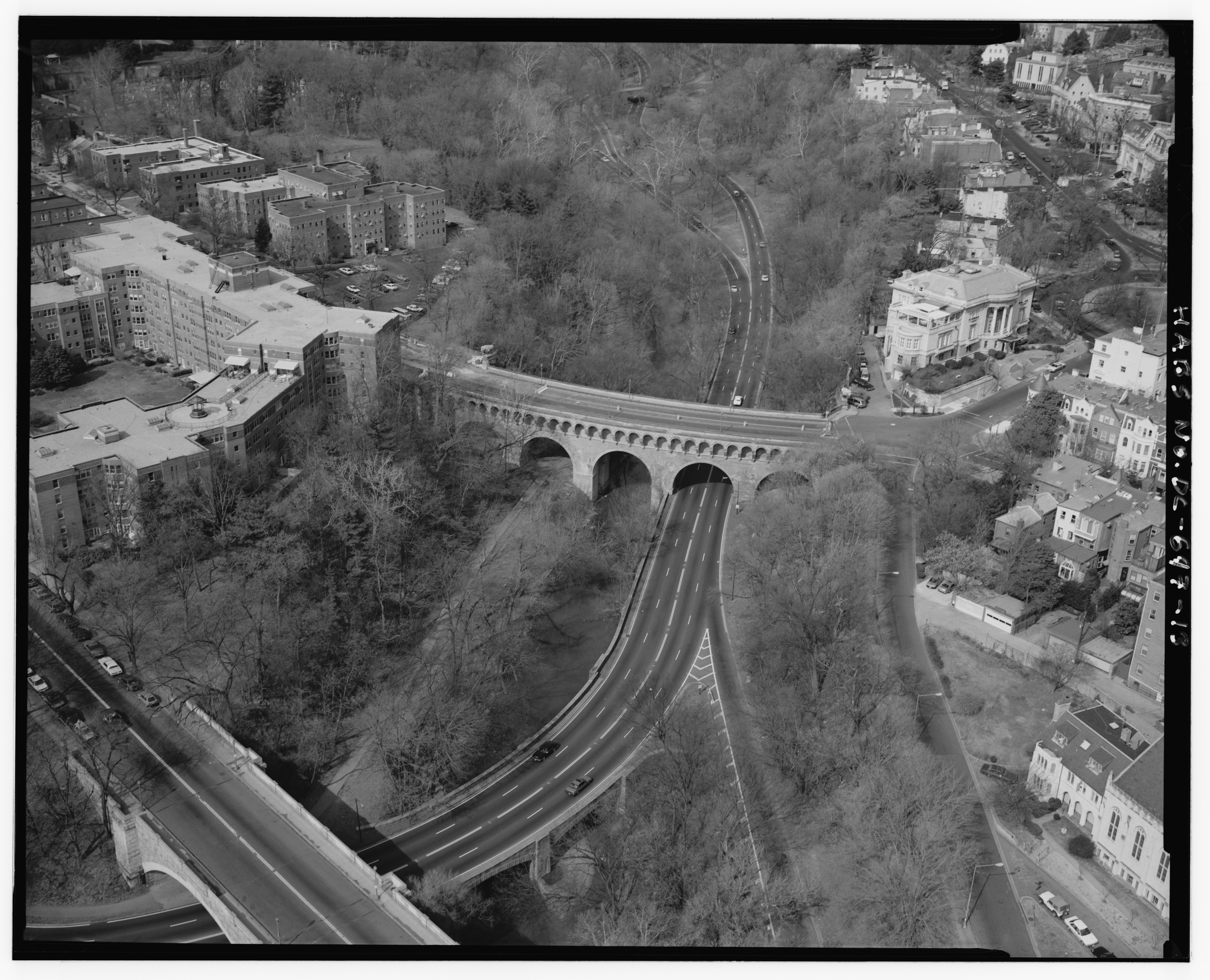
The bridge (bottom center) in context with the nearby P Street Bridge (bottom left) and Dumbarton Bridge (top)

The Rock Creek and Potomac Parkway Bridge near P Street is a bridge carrying the Rock Creek and Potomac Parkway across Rock Creek in Washington, DC. It is the middle of three bridges where the Rock Creek and Potomac Parkway switches from one side of the river to the other, the others being the L Street Bridge and the Shoreham Hill Bridge. The bridge is near the site of a historical river ford used by French soldiers traveling to Yorktown in 1781. The bridge is reinforced concrete faced in mica schist.

== History ==
The original 1908 plans had the parkway cross from the west to the east side of Rock Creek farther north, near Lyons Mill. Frederick Law Olmsted opposed having the parkway run on the east side north of Q Street, due to the extensive grading required to accommodate the steepness of the valley at that point. The retaining walls that were built to protect the parkway proved inadequate, as a 1935 landslide after a heavy rain partially blocked the parkway for the next two years.

The section of the Rock Creek and Potomac Parkway from P Street south to K Street was the last portion of the parkway to open, in 1935. Initially, there was no bridge directly connecting the new segment to the existing segment on the opposite side of the creek. Traffic had to exit the parkway and climb out of the valley to city streets, use the high-level P Street Bridge, and then descend back into the valley.

The low-level bridge directly connecting the parkway segments and bypassing the high-level bridge was completed in 1936, and was the last original bridge constructed on the parkway. This completed the final link, allowing motorists to drive from Virginia Avenue to Rock Creek Park without any stoplights, leading to a rapid increase in commuter traffic that soon necessitated measures such as operating the entire parkway one-way during rush hour.
