= L Street Bridge =

Road bridge in Washington, D.C., United States

Coordinates: 38.903978°N 77.056590°W

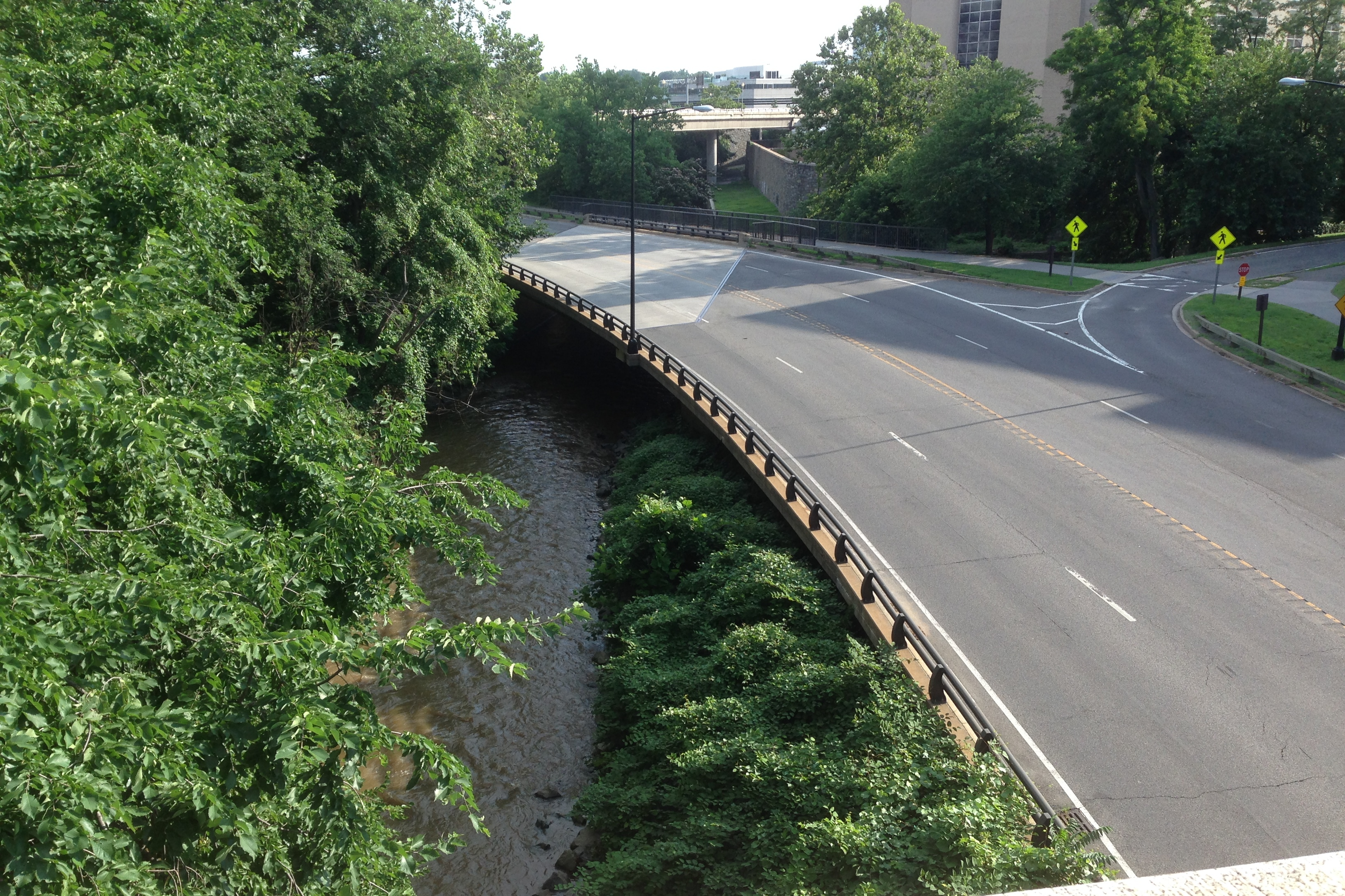
The L Street Bridge in 2015

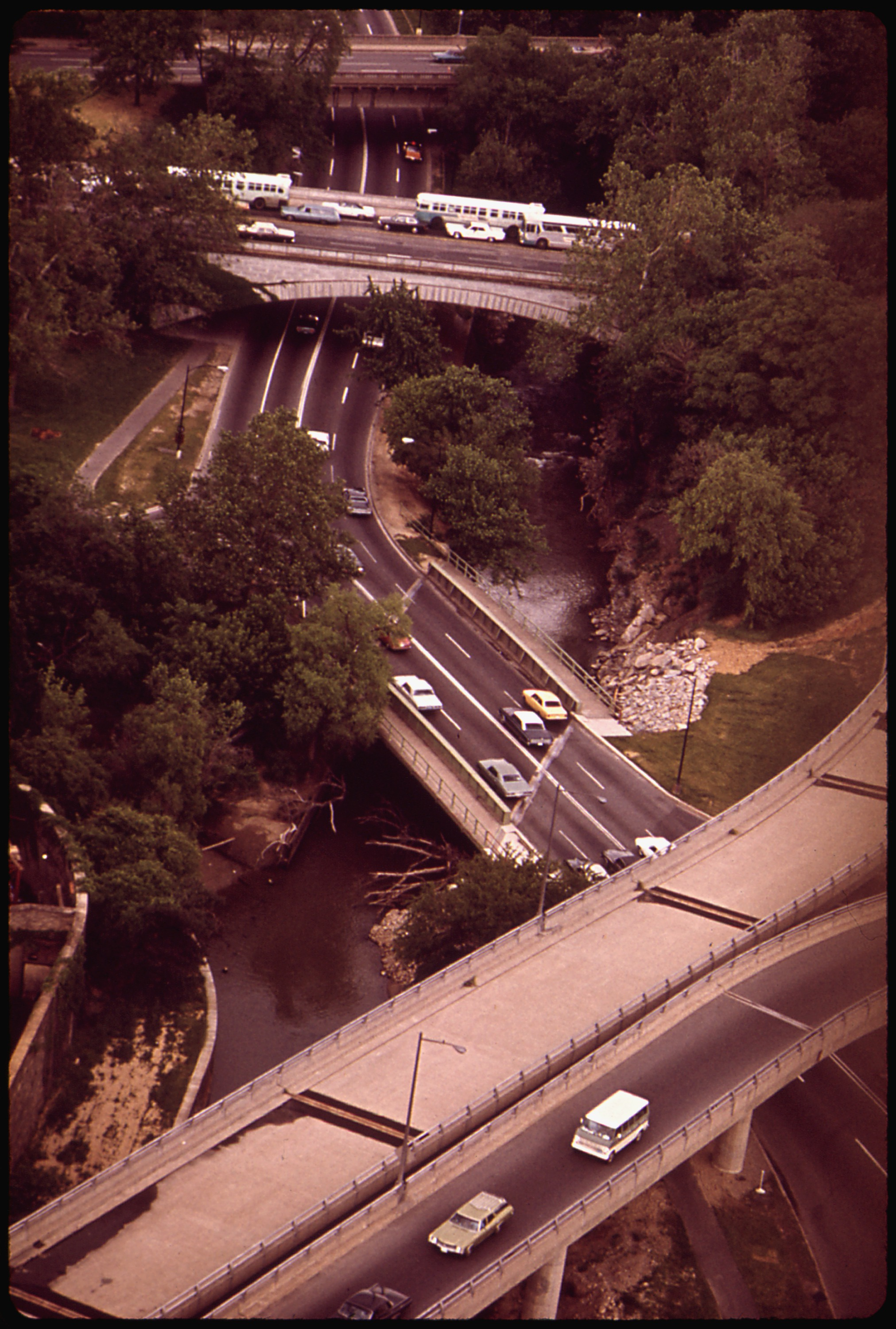
Aerial view of the L Street Bridge, at center, 1973

The L Street Bridge is a bridge carrying the Rock Creek and Potomac Parkway over Rock Creek in Washington, D.C. It is the most downstream of three bridges where the Parkway switches from one side of the river to the other, the others being the bridge near P Street and the Shoreham Hill Bridge. Despite its name, the bridge does not carry or cross L Street, but it is adjacent to L Street's western terminus.

The construction of the original bridge at this site was delayed by long-standing legal issues with the owners of the Chesapeake and Ohio Canal, which terminated at Rock Creek close to the position of the bridge. A lawsuit was initiated as early as 1912, but a resolution was not forthcoming. The situation changed in 1924 when a major flood damaged the canal to the point where it was uneconomical to repair it, strengthening the government's legal position. By 1931 these difficulties had been overcome and the bridge was scheduled to be completed by 1933.

As the center portion of the parkway between K Street and P Street was the last to be completed, the L Street Bridge was initially unused while work continued. This middle portion was especially difficult to regrade and landscape because the valley had been used as an extensive dumping ground for debris and ashes.

The original versions of both the L Street Bridge and Shoreham Hill Bridge were purposely built in a utilitarian style, using salvaged steel trusses from the Georgetown Aqueduct Bridge, in order to encourage the public to demand to replace them. The bridges were in fact replaced about ten years later. The current bridge was constructed from 1981 to 1983.
