= Shoreham Hill Bridge =

Coordinates: 38.9199°N 77.0528°W

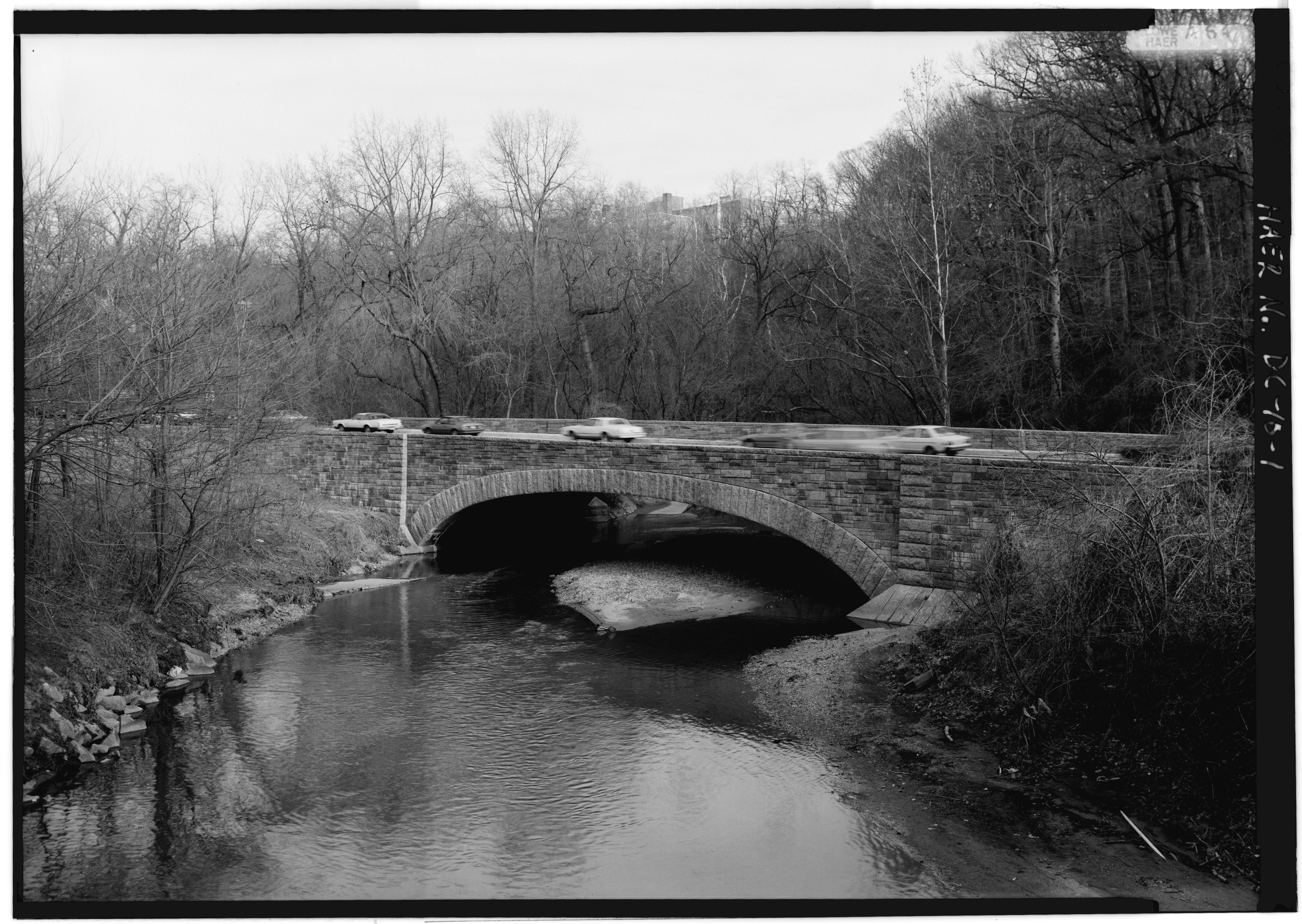
The Shoreham Hill Bridge in 1989

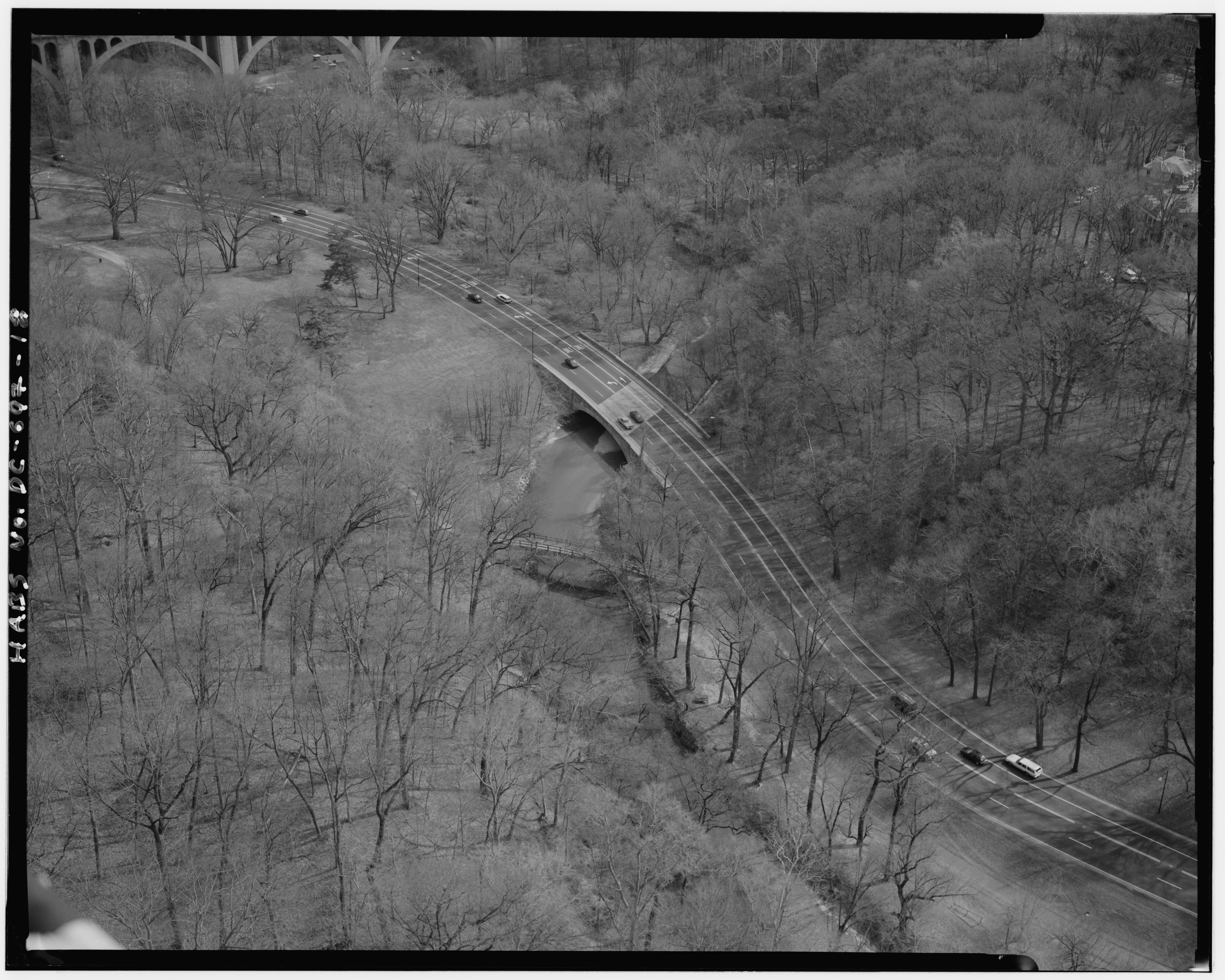
The Shoreham Hill Bridge in context with the nearby Saddle Club Footbridge, and the Taft Bridge in the distance

The Shoreham Hill Bridge is a bridge carrying the Rock Creek and Potomac Parkway across Rock Creek in Washington, DC. It is the most upstream of three bridges where the Rock Creek and Potomac Parkway switches from one side of the river to the other, the others being the bridge near P Street and the L Street Bridge.

== History ==
As part of the construction of the Rock Creek and Potomac Parkway in the 1930s, the original bridge was purposely built in a utilitarian style, using salvaged steel trusses from the Georgetown Aqueduct Bridge. According to Rock Creek and Potomac Parkway Commission executive officer Ulysses S. Grant III, the bridge's appearance would encourage the public to demand a more aesthetically pleasing and expensive bridge. The steel-girder bridge was constructed in 1929, part of the first stretch of the parkway opened.

It was indeed soon considered to not fit in with the desired appearance of the park, as well as being a traffic hazard, and attracted the disapproval of the United States Commission of Fine Arts, which was responsible for reviewing architecture in the capital. The new bridge was constructed in 1938 and cost nearly $103,000. Due to the volume of traffic that the bridge would handle, it was constructed in two halves: the upstream lanes of the old bridge were demolished and then that half of the new bridge was constructed, followed by the same process on the downstream lanes.

The current bridge is a concrete-arch bridge with mica schist facing quarried from Bethesda and Cabin John, Maryland, together with some granite elements. As was common in parkway design at the time, it was designed to be harmonious with its surroundings. The bridge was rehabilitated in 1987.
