= Arlington Memorial Bridge =

Bridge in Washington, D.C.

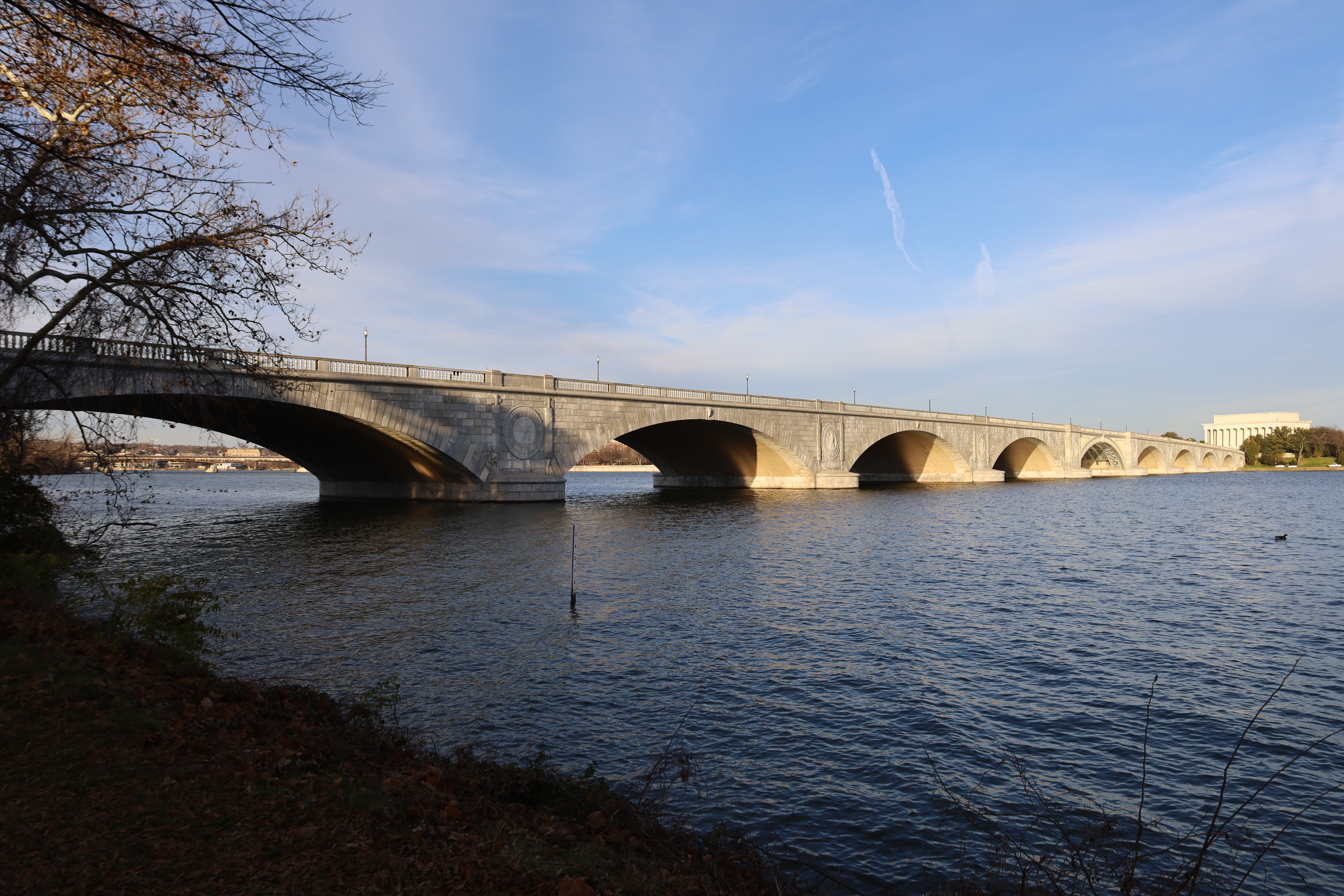
- The bridge in December 2020, shortly after the completion of renovations
- Coordinates: 38°53′14″N 77°3′20″W
- Locale: Potomac River; Washington, D.C.

Characteristics
- Total length: 2,163 ft (659.3 m)

History
- Architect: McKim, Mead, and White
- Built: 1932

Statistics
- Arlington Memorial Bridge
- U.S. National Register of Historic Places
- D.C. Inventory of Historic Sites
- Architectural style: Neoclassical; Central bascule Arch bridge
- NRHP reference No.: 80000346

Significant dates
- Added to NRHP: April 4, 1980
- Designated DCIHS: November 8, 1964

Location
- Interactive map of Arlington Memorial Bridge

The Arlington Memorial Bridge (often shortened to Memorial Bridge) is a neoclassical steel and stone arch bridge that spans the Potomac River in Washington, D.C., linking the National Mall to Arlington National Cemetery. First proposed in 1886, the bridge went unbuilt for decades thanks to political quarrels over whether the bridge should be a memorial, and to whom or what. Traffic problems associated with the dedication of the Tomb of the Unknown Soldier in November 1921 and the desire to build a bridge in time for the bicentennial of the birth of George Washington led to its construction in 1932.

The bridge was designed by the architectural firm McKim, Mead, and White. It is decorated with monumental statues depicting valor and sacrifice, designed by sculptor Leo Friedlander and cast by the Ferdinando Marinelli Artistic Foundry of Florence, Italy. The central section, a bascule (drawbridge) which had not been used since 1961, was replaced in 2018 by one that does not open.

== Early attempts to build a bridge ==
=== Early memorial bridge proposals ===
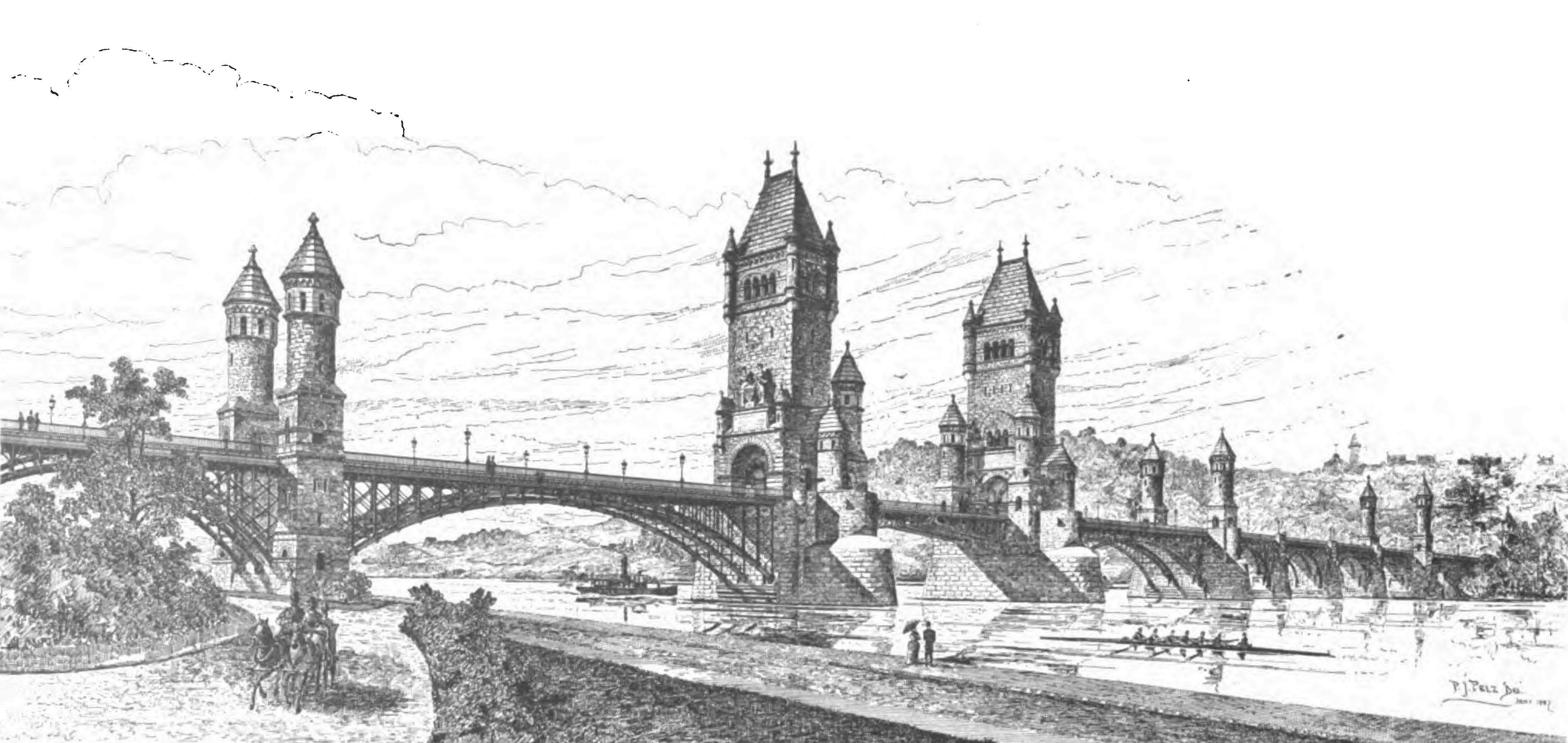
An early 1887 design for the memorial bridge across the Potomac River, by Paul J. Pelz

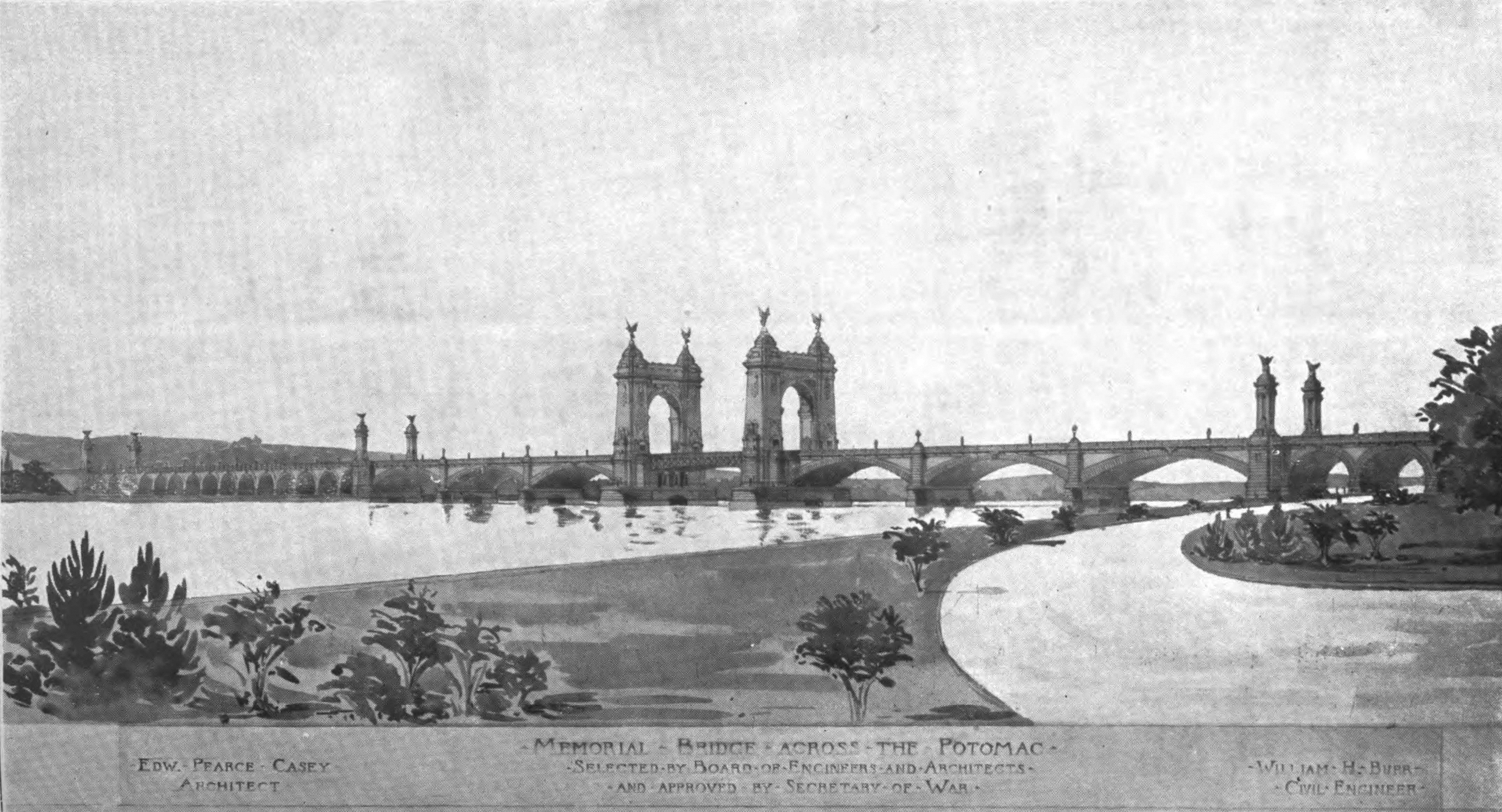
A 1901 design for the memorial bridge by Edward P. Casey and William H. Burr, accepted by the Secretary of War but never constructed

Congress first proposed a bridge at the site of the current structure on May 24, 1886. The resolution required that the United States Department of War study the feasibility of a bridge at the site, and a 24-foot (7.3 m) wide design was proposed later that year. The following year, the War Department suggested a "Lincoln-Grant Memorial Bridge". The Washington Post supported the idea of naming the bridge after both Robert E. Lee and Grant. Congress again passed a resolution requesting another design, and in late 1887 the department proposed a "General Ulysses S. Grant Memorial Bridge". The new bridge would be a suspension bridge 105 feet (32 m) high, with 98 feet (30 m) of clearance below it. Designs for the bridge at this time included a bare steel truss bridge, a low masonry arch bridge, and a Romanesque Revival structure by Paul J. Pelz with two massive central towers, two barbicans on each end, and exuberant ornamentation. Senator John W. Daniel sponsored legislation in 1897 funding a survey of the bedrock in the Potomac River. Congress approved the legislation the same year, and the United States Army Corps of Engineers began the survey in July. The survey was delivered in March 1898.

Because the bridge was conceived as a memorial to Grant, Congress repeatedly blocked funding for the bridge. But after the Corps' survey was complete, Congress authorized the Secretary of War to expend $5,000 ($193,500 in 2025 dollars) on a bridge design competition. To help improve the prospects for a bridge, a "National Memorial Bridge Association" was formed. (Note: The primary backers of the association were attorney D. K. Trimmer and engineer George A. Arms, both of York, Pennsylvania; real estate developer and insurance company executive Samuel Bealmear of Baltimore, Maryland; prominent D.C. businessman and civic booster W. S. McKean; Alexandria, Virginia, public schools superintendent James E. Clements; and others.) In July, four prominent bridge engineers from New York City — George S. Morrison, Leffert L. Buck, William H. Burr, and William R. Hutton — were invited to submit designs for a memorial bridge to honor American war dead. (Note: Originally, 15 engineers were to be invited, but government officials believed the monetary prizes offered would be too small. By reducing the number of entrants, the amount of the prize could be boosted.) A five-member board appointed by the Secretary of War (Note: Members of the board were Lieutenant Colonel Charles J. Allen, Army Corps of Engineers; Major T.W. Symons, Army Corps of Engineers; Captain David Du B. Gaillard, Army Corps of Engineers and assistant to the Commissioners of the District of Columbia; architect Stanford White; and former Supervising Architect of the Treasury James G. Hill.) selected a design by William H. Burr and architect Edward P. Casey (designer of the Taft Bridge). Their design, based on the 1887 winning plan, called for a drawbridge made of steel and stone with 36 arches. A "classical" tower sat over each end of the draw span, on top of which would stand bronze statues of Victory. Statues of famous generals and statesmen (in either bronze or granite) would line both sides of the bridge.

Senator George F. Hoar blocked the bridge from being built in June 1900 because he opposed the design. The National Memorial Bridge Association began pushing again for a bridge in October 1900, and commissioned Connecticut architect George Keller to design plans. Keller's design went on display in Washington in November. Contrary to almost all previous designs, his bridge was low to the water and eliminated a draw span. His design featured a monumental Romanesque Revival arch for the D.C. approaches and a memorial column celebrating the Union on the Virginia side, both to be placed in traffic circles. Keller's design was published in architectural magazines, and by 1901 was widely seen as the appropriate design for the bridge.

In 1901, the American Institute of Architects proposed that the bridge extend New York Avenue NW (which then ended at 23rd Street NW) over the Potomac to Arlington National Cemetery. But once more, Congress did not act.

=== McMillan Plan proposal ===
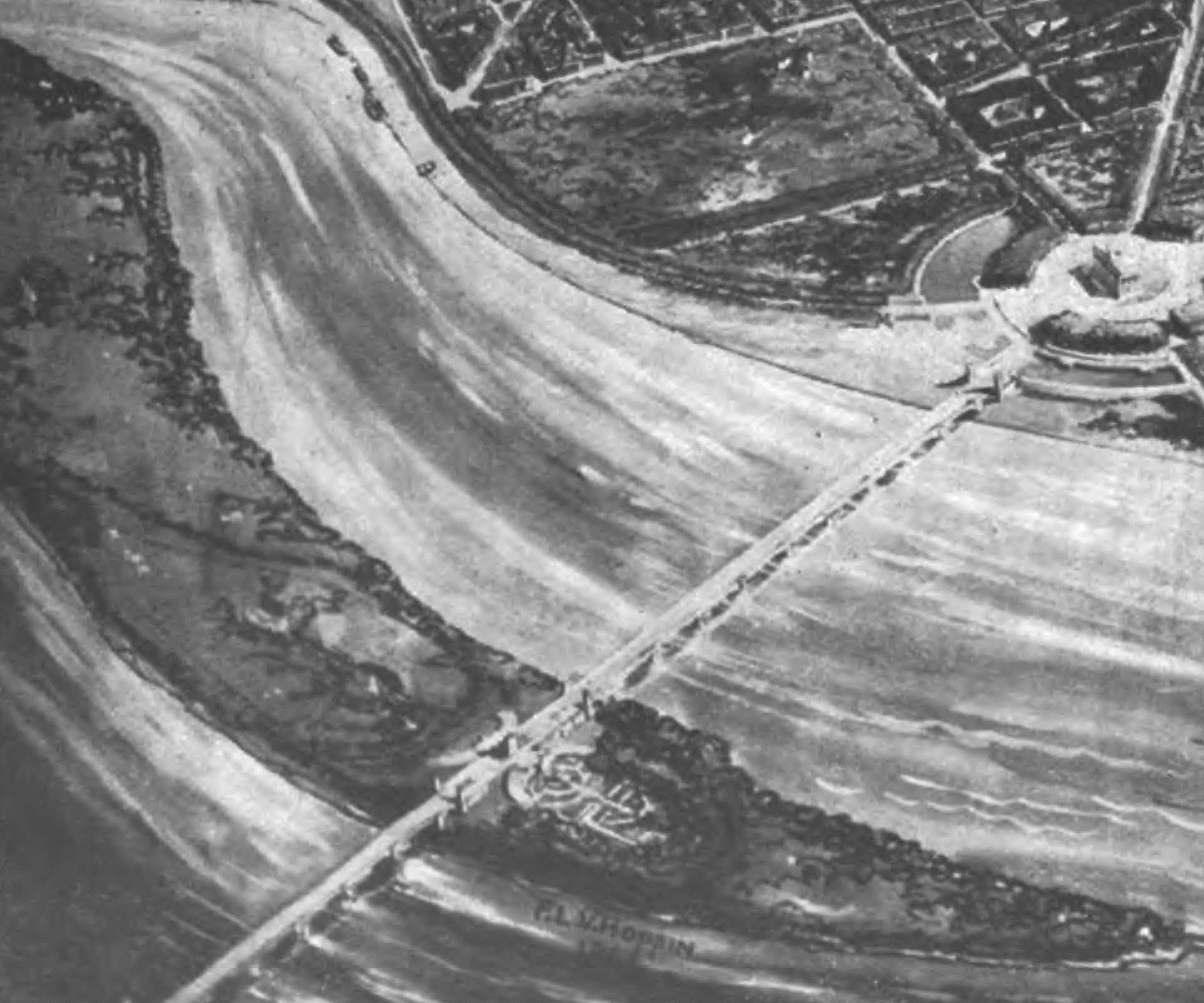
The Senate Park Commission's proposal for the location of Arlington Memorial Bridge over the Potomac River

In 1900, the U.S. Senate created the Senate Park Commission to reconcile competing visions for the development of Washington, D.C., and especially the National Mall and nearby areas. Popularly known as the McMillan Commission after its chairman, Senator James McMillan of Michigan, the commission issued its report (commonly referred to as the "McMillan Plan") on January 15, 1902.

The McMillan Plan proposed siting a major new bridge and memorial at the western end of the National Mall, an area also known as West Potomac Park. Almost none of the National Mall west of the Washington Monument grounds and below Constitution Avenue NW existed prior to 1882. After terrible flooding inundated much of downtown Washington, D.C., in 1881, Congress ordered the Army Corps of Engineers to dredge a deep channel in the Potomac and use the material to fill in the Potomac shoreline (creating the current banks of the river) and raise this and much of the land near the White House and along Pennsylvania Avenue NW by nearly 6 feet (1.8 m) to prevent future flooding. This "reclaimed land" — which included West Potomac Park, East Potomac Park, and the Tidal Basin — was largely complete by 1890, and designated Potomac Park by Congress in 1897. Congress first appropriated money for the beautification of the reclaimed land in 1902, which led to the planting of sod, bushes, and trees; grading and paving of sidewalks, bridle paths, and driveways; and the installation of water, drainage, and sewage pipes.

Although Congress did not formally adopt the McMillan Plan, it began to implement it piecemeal over the next several years. In 1910, Congress enacted legislation establishing the United States Commission of Fine Arts, a body of federally-appointed architects, landscape architects, and others who began to formally push for construction of the bridge envisioned by the McMillan Plan. On March 4, 1913, Congress enacted the Public Buildings Act which, among other things, created and funded an Arlington Memorial Bridge Commission whose purpose was to settle on a design for the bridge and report back to Congress. Its members included the President of the United States, President of the Senate, Speaker of the House of Representatives, and the chairs of the committees on public grounds and buildings of the House and Senate (or their designees). But Congress appropriated no money for the commission's operation due to the onset of World War I, and it remained inactive.

== Construction: 1922–1932 ==
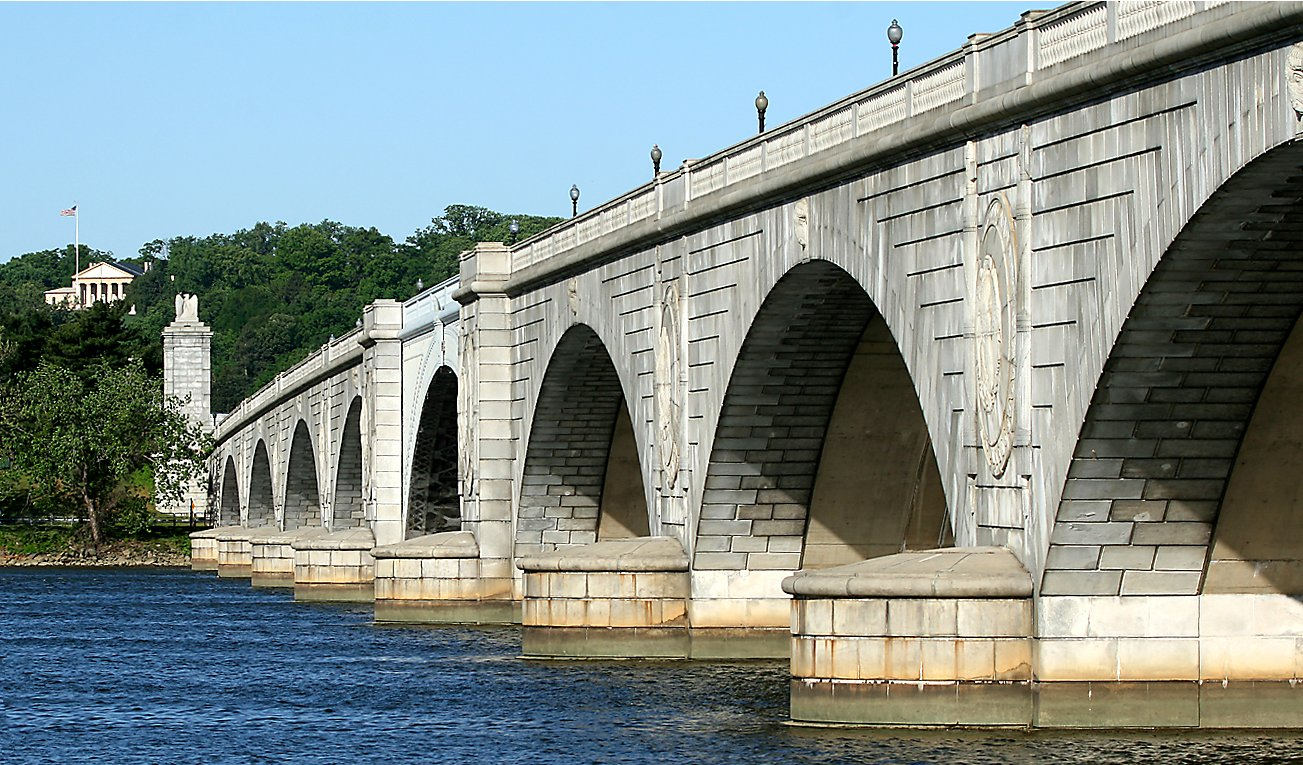
Memorial Bridge in 2007, with the Arlington National Cemetery and Arlington House in the background

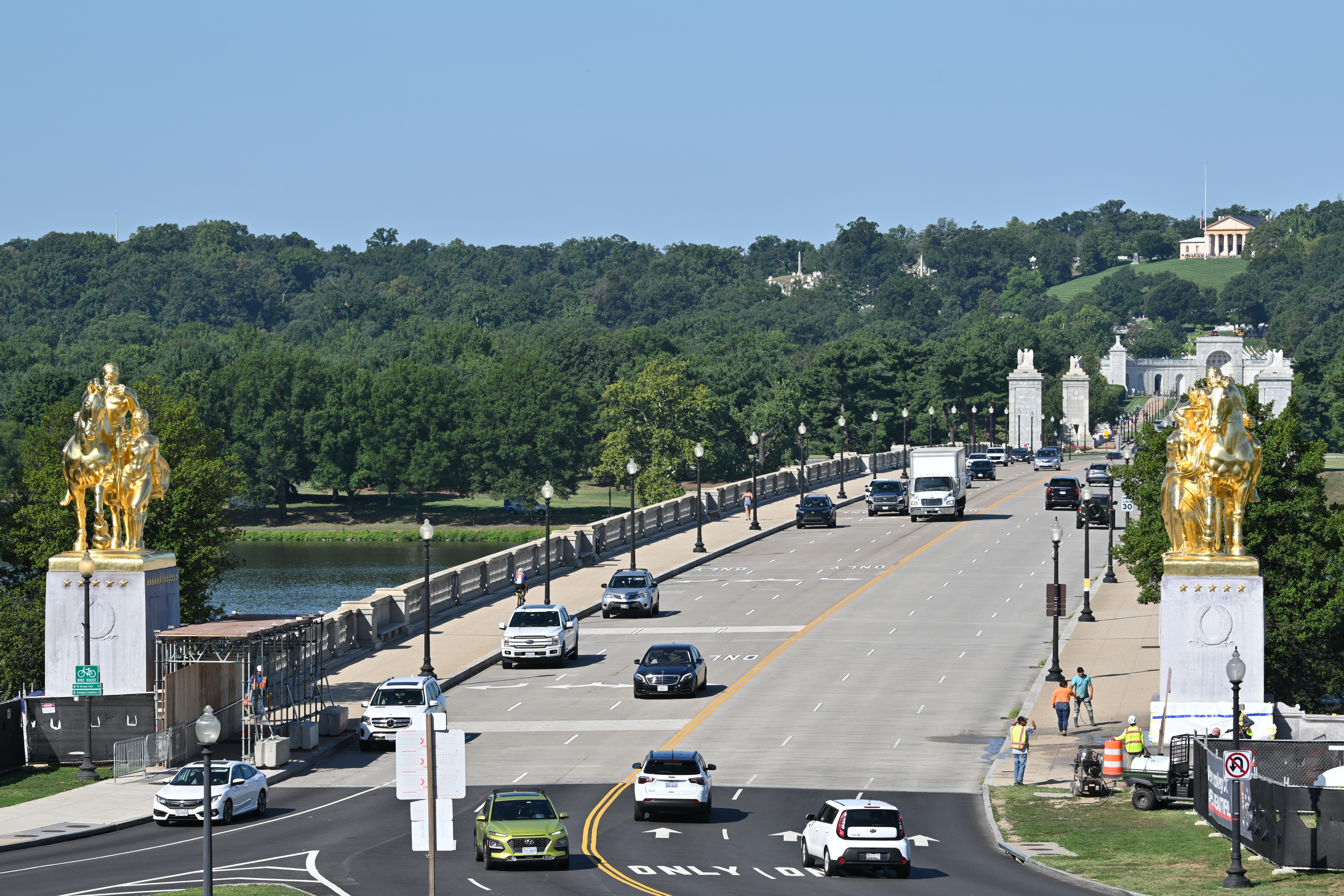
Arlington Memorial Bridge from Washington, D.C. The entrance of Arlington National Cemetery in the background.

On November 11, 1921, President Warren G. Harding traveled to the dedication ceremony for the Tomb of the Unknown Soldier at Arlington National Cemetery. He became caught in a three-hour traffic jam because Highway Bridge (on which he traveled) could not handle the traffic. Resolving to prevent that from happening again, Harding sought an appropriation of $25,000 in 1922 to fund the work of the bridge commission. Congress approved his request on June 12, 1922.

Initially, the Arlington Memorial Bridge Commission proposed a site for the bridge at the New York Avenue site, upstream from its current position. But the Commission of Fine Arts (CFA), which had legislative authority to approve the siting and design of memorials, opposed the plan. With President Harding presiding, the Arlington Memorial Bridge Commission held a joint meeting with Vice President Calvin Coolidge and the Commission of Fine Arts on December 18, 1922, at which time it was unanimously decided to adhere to the McMillan Plan and build the bridge on a line of sight between the Lincoln Memorial and Arlington House in Arlington National Cemetery. The parties also agreed to seek to construct a low (rather than monumental) bridge with a bascule (drawbridge) in the center to permit ship traffic to reach the Georgetown waterfront.

=== Bridge design considerations ===
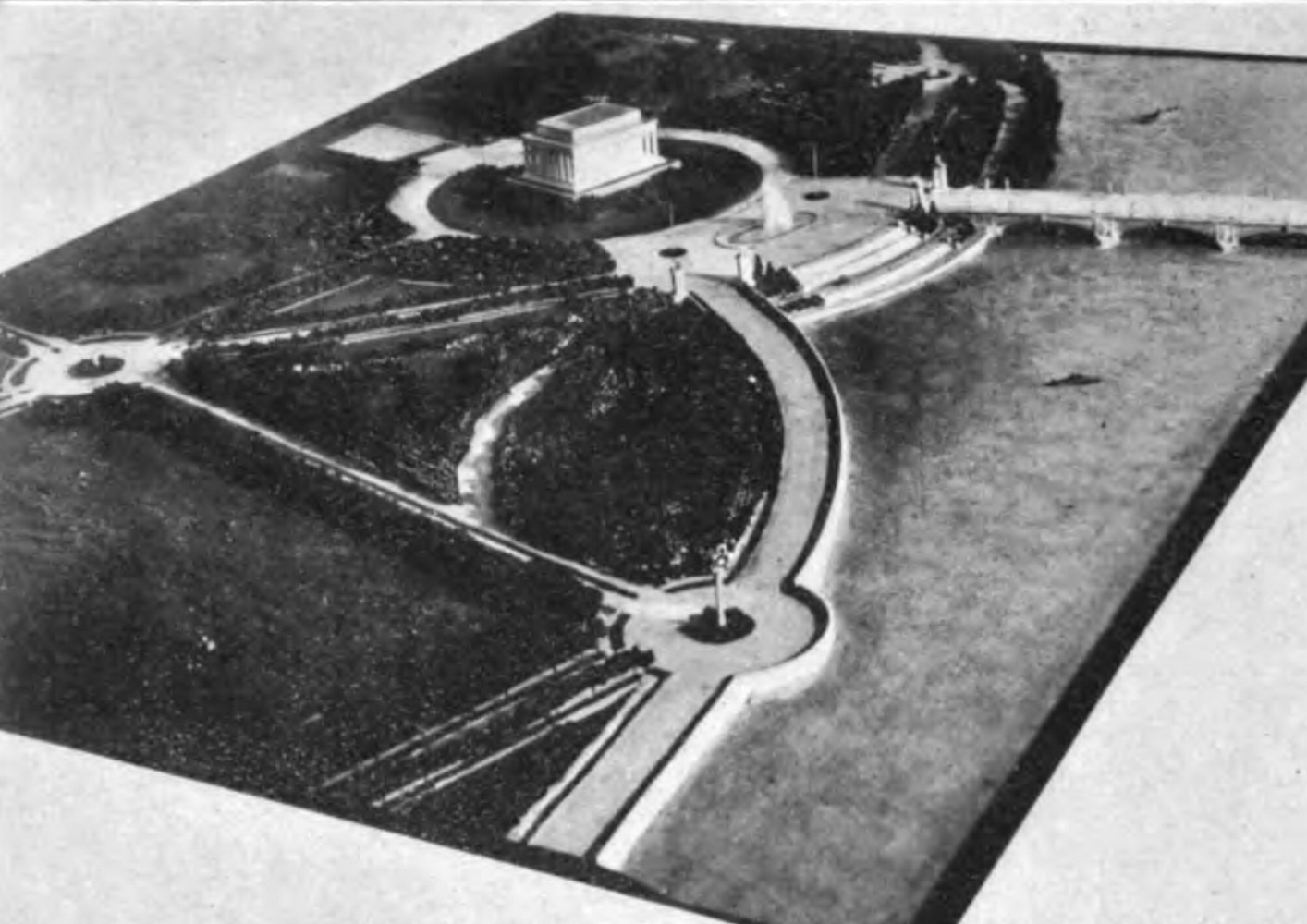
1926 model of the proposed eastern approaches to Arlington Memorial Bridge

The bridge commission asked the Commission of Fine Arts whether there should be an open design competition (as in the past) or whether the bridge commission should pick a designer itself. The CFA recommended a direct selection, and provided the names of three firms: Charles A. Platt, who designed the Freer Gallery of Art; Paul Philippe Cret, who designed the Pan-American Union Building; and the firm of McKim, Mead and White. The bridge commission chose a direct selection, and picked McKim, Mead and White on April 4, 1923. Architect William Mitchell Kendall was the lead designer. (Note: McKim, Mead and White only had responsibility for the architectural features of the bridge. The bridge commission turned over engineering aspects of the bridge to the Corps of Engineers on June 29, 1922.)

Members of the D.C. business community pressed for an immediate decision on whether the bridge would have a draw span. Merchants in Georgetown wanted their small harbor to be reachable by large ships. On February 17, 1923, Colonel C.O. Sherrill of the Army Corps of Engineers stated that the Corps would only approve a bridge with a draw span.

Kendall's first design, submitted to the CFA in May 1923, was generally well received. His plan envisioned a low, Neoclassical arch bridge. Two statues stood atop each pier on both sides of the bridge. The D.C. approaches consisted of a traffic circle around the Lincoln Memorial linked to the Potomac River by a plaza and monumental steps (the "watergate"). Two memorial columns were to be placed in this plaza. On the Columbia Island landing, Kendall envisioned a large intersection circumscribed by a grassy ellipse, with traffic circles at the terminus of the north and south arms of the crossroad. The traffic circles would accommodate Lee Highway and the Mt. Vernon Memorial Parkway. Within the ellipse would be placed two 181-foot (55 m) tall memorial columns. Two circular Greek Revival temples were planned for the western shoreline. The commission was especially pleased that Kendall had the Rock Creek and Potomac Parkway linked to the traffic circle around the Lincoln Memorial rather than passing beneath the bridge via an arch. (Kendall had, in fact, intended to pass it through one of the bridge's arches but forgot to make the change.) However, CFA members asked that he consider widening the bridge to 100 feet (30 m) from the proposed 80 feet (24 m). The CFA also discussed at length its long-standing proposal for a major traffic circle on Columbia Island, within which would be placed a memorial to Robert E. Lee. There was also concern whether enough space had been allotted to permit the Mount Vernon Memorial Parkway, Lee Highway, and Memorial Drive (which was planned to cross the Boundary Channel via the Boundary Channel Bridge into Virginia and link with the main gate to Arlington National Cemetery). When the CFA gave its preliminary approval to the bridge design (but withheld a resolution on the approaches), models of the bridge went on public display in February 1924.

=== Legislative approval ===
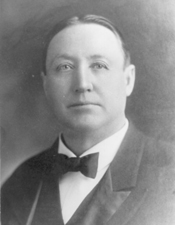
Senator Bert M. Fernald, who sponsored the legislation which authorized construction of the bridge

A bill authorizing construction of Arlington Memorial Bridge was introduced in the U.S. Senate on April 25, 1924, by Senator Bert M. Fernald. The Senate Committee on Public Buildings and Grounds reported out the bill in mid-May. But the legislation languished. With Congress due to adjourn on March 4, 1925, the Senate finally passed the bridge bill on December 30, 1924. Senator William Borah made a motion to reconsider the bill in late January 1925, Borah's motion did not ask the House to return the Senate-passed bill, so his motion would not affect the bill's passage either way.

The bridge authorization faced a far more difficult time in the U.S. House of Representatives. The House Committee on Public Buildings and Grounds speedily approved the bill and reported it on January 27, 1925, less than a month after receiving it from the Senate. But with a legislative logjam in the House and only about 30 days left in the legislative session, the bill's chances for approval seemed slim. Floor managers helping to guide the bill through the final approval process tried to bring the bill up for approval on January 30, believing they had the necessary two-thirds majority to suspend the rules to allow the bill to be considered. Instead, the House voted to suspend the legislative calendar — blocking all legislative except for appropriations bills.

Floor managers won a major victory, however, when the House quickly passed the appropriations legislation and allowed the bridge bill to be considered on February 18. There was significant opposition to the bill on the House floor. Many Democrats opposed the bill, and several Republicans felt it went against President Calvin Coolidge's budgetary restraint program. Many members of Congress received feedback from their constituents, who did not want their tax dollars to pay for a bridge in the District of Columbia. Representative Louis C. Cramton offered an amendment to the District of Columbia pay an "equitable amount" of the bridge's cost. (The amount was to be established by Congress at a future date.) His amendment passed by a vote of 103–89. Amendments to make the city pay 60 percent of the cost, to make the state of Virginia pay half the cost, and require the Army Corps of Engineers to build the bridge were defeated. Finally, the House approved the Arlington Memorial Bridge bill by a vote of 204–125.

The Senate agreed to the House amendments on February 20, and President Coolidge signed it into law on February 24, 1925. In 1926 Comptroller General John R. McCarl voided contracts for the construction of the $12.5 million bridge because they called for the hiring of a general contractor and not specific individuals, as he believed the law required. In 1927, Congress changed the law so the contracts could proceed.

=== Bridge construction ===
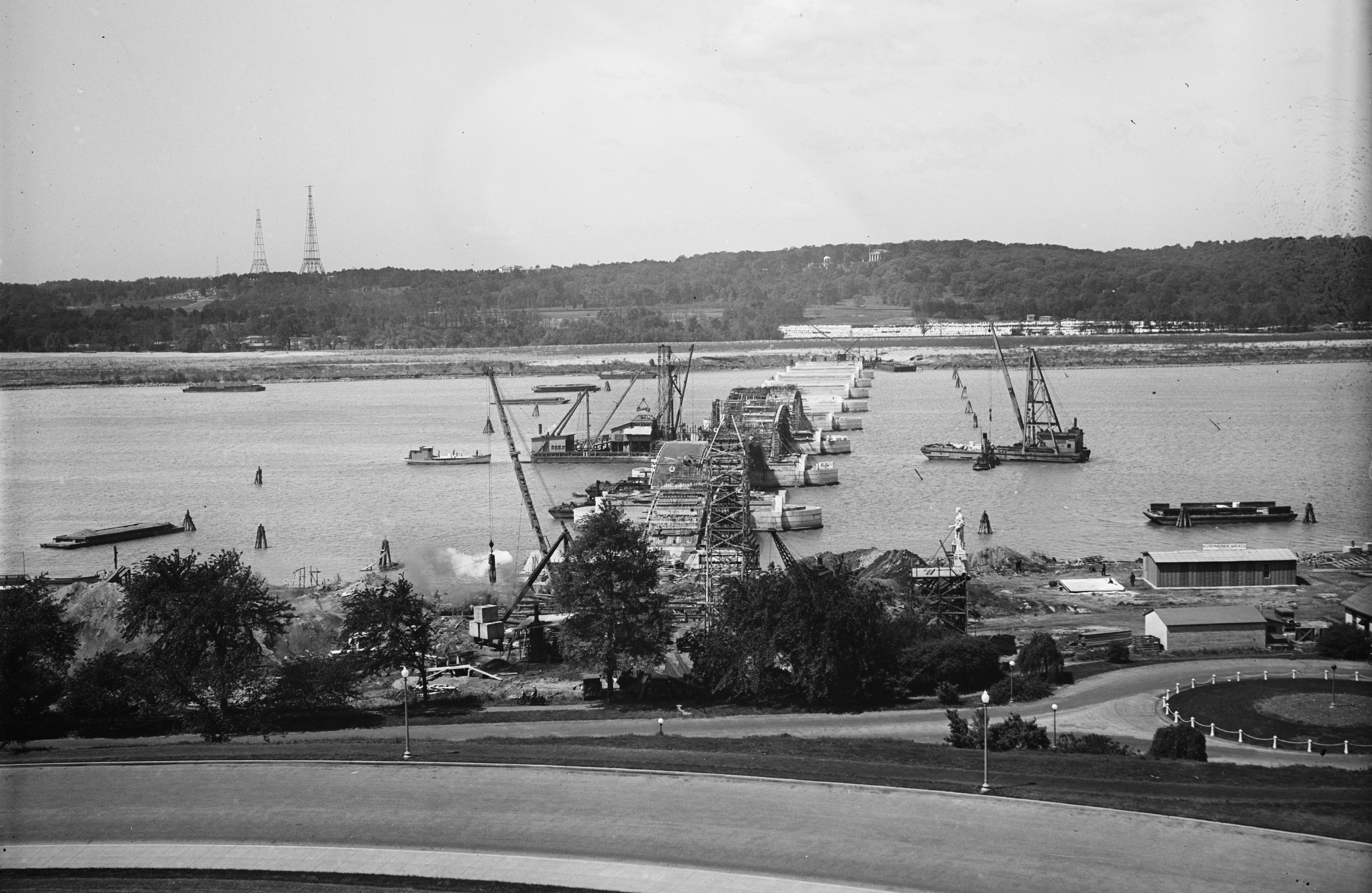
Arlington Memorial Bridge under construction in 1928

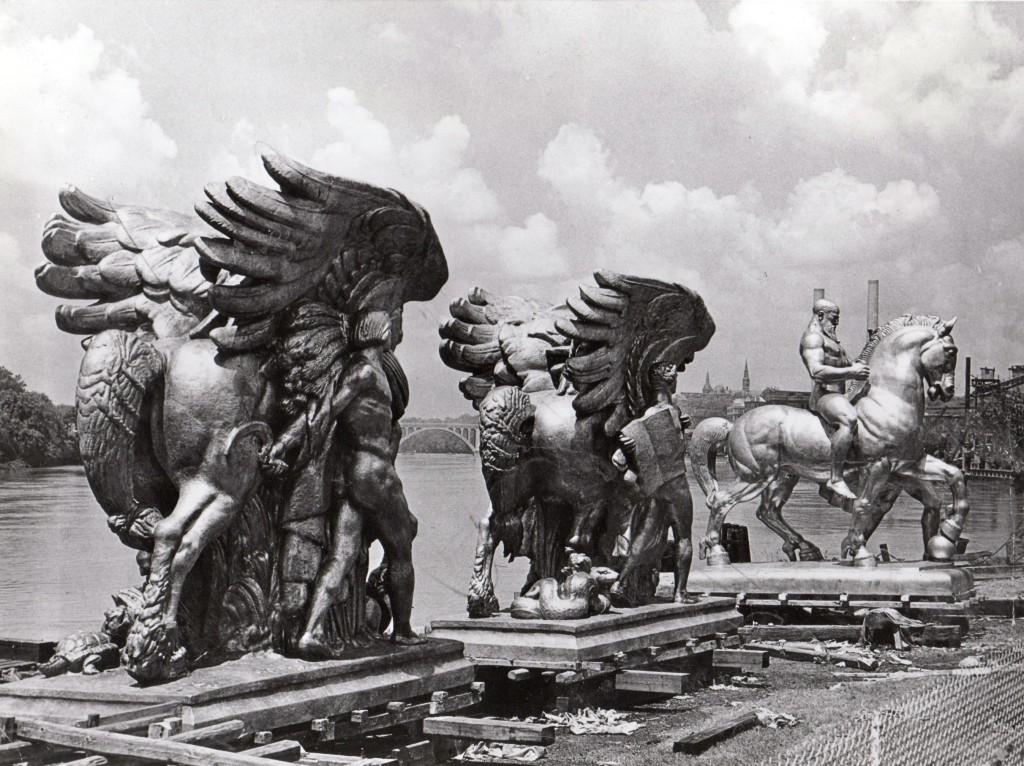
The Arlington Memorial Bridge sculptures, before installation, near Georgetown.

The Arlington Memorial Bridge Commission oversaw the design and construction of the bridge. Arlington Memorial Bridge informally opened on January 16, 1932. The dedication ceremony was headed by President Herbert Hoover who became the first person to drive across it, leading a small party of 12 cars down the George Washington Parkway to Mt. Vernon as a kick-off for Washington's 200th birthday celebration. Due to a lack of lights, ongoing construction and poor connections on the Virginia side, the bridge and highway were only open during daylight hours on Saturday and Sunday. Weekend-only operations ended on March 16, 1932. Though temporary lights were added in time for the 200th birthday, the bridge wasn't opened for day and night use until both the bridge and highway were officially illuminated on May 6, 1932.

Designed by architectural firm McKim, Mead, and White, the neoclassical bridge is 2,163 feet (659 m) long. The bridge cost $7.25 million to build, of which $900,000 was attributed to the center draw span.

Construction of the Virginia approaches to the bridge took six years. The National Capital Parks Commission (NCPC) had authority to plan and approve regional transportation plans, and wanted the Virginia approaches to the bridge to be new roads. This would help stimulate housing and economic growth in Arlington County. The state of Virginia (which would provide some of the funding for the approaches) and Arlington County officials wrestled with the problems of cost and development. New roads and approaches would be the most costly (largely due to the need to obtain rights-of-way), a major consideration in the Great Depression. Yet, connecting the bridge to existing roadways would not stimulate development. The choice of a route also had political considerations, as neighborhoods vied to be the recipient of this economic stimulus. The construction of Lee Boulevard (now known as Arlington Boulevard) and Washington Boulevard eastward both provided an opportunity for economic stimulus. The state and county eventually agreed to push Lee Boulevard north around Arlington National Cemetery. When this project ran into rights-of-way problems, the state and county constructed Washington Boulevard south around the cemetery. When the Lee Boulevard problems were resolved, and with the addition of large amounts of new federal dollars, the state and county resumed construction of the Lee Boulevard approaches. The Lee Boulevard approach finally opened in October 1938. The construction of The Pentagon in 1941 and extensive war-related building south of the cemetery in 1942 led the federal government to approve a second connection by extending Washington Boulevard past Arlington National Cemetery and over Boundary Channel as well.

At the time it opened, the Arlington Memorial Bridge bascule span was the longest, heaviest (3,000 short tons (2,700 t)), and fastest-opening bascule span in the world.

== Description ==
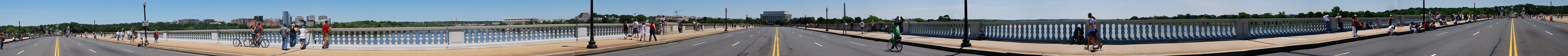
Panorama of Arlington Memorial Bridge

The bridge's northeastern approaches frame, in part, the Lincoln Memorial, while the bridge's southwestern landing is on Columbia Island. The northeastern end of the bridge marks the western edge of the National Mall. The southwestern end connects with Memorial Drive, which crosses the Boundary Channel Bridge into Virginia and travels to Arlington National Cemetery in Arlington County.

In 2011, the bridge carried about 54,000 vehicles a day.

=== Architecture ===
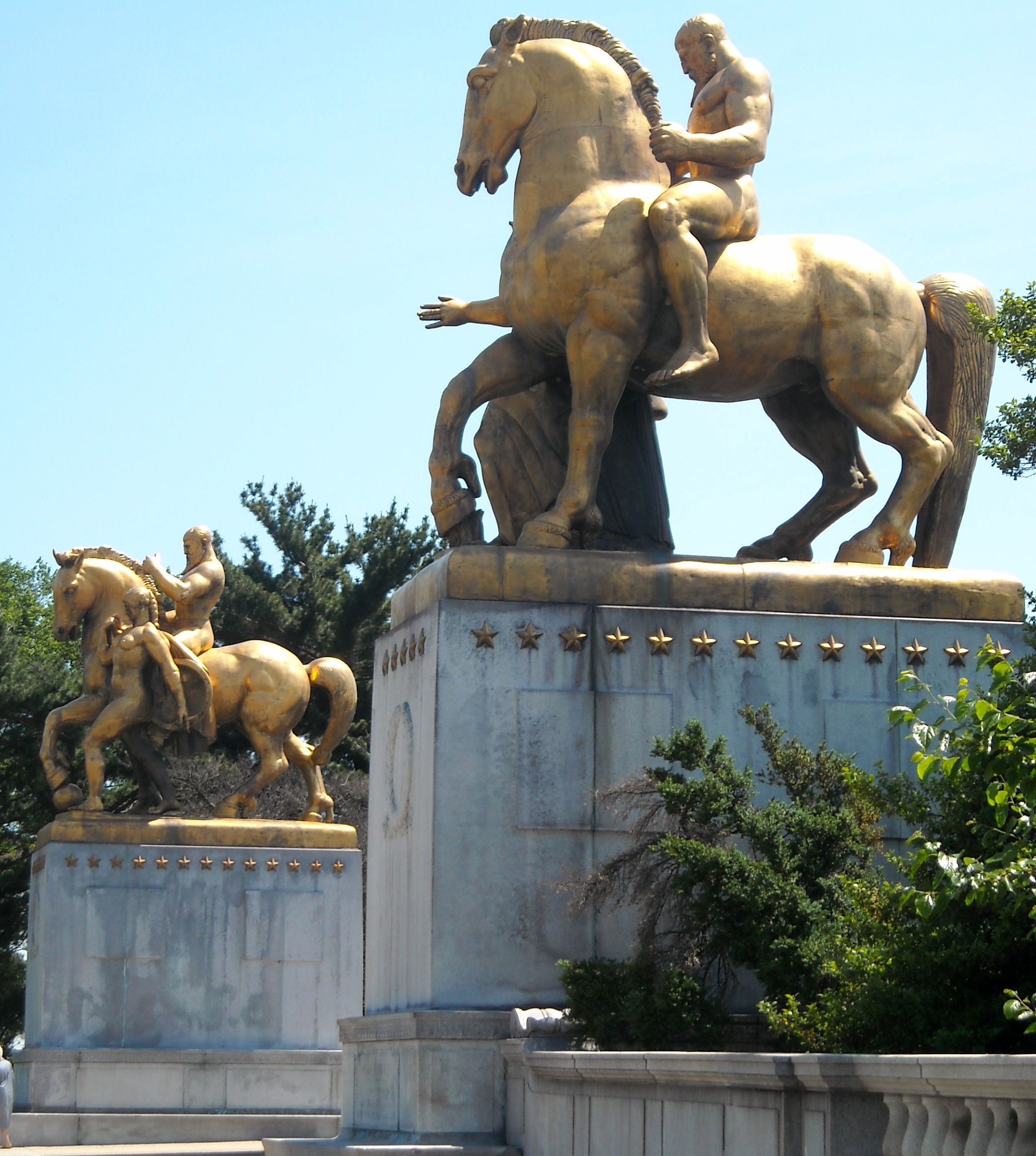
The Arts of War statues at the eastern entrance to the Arlington Memorial Bridge

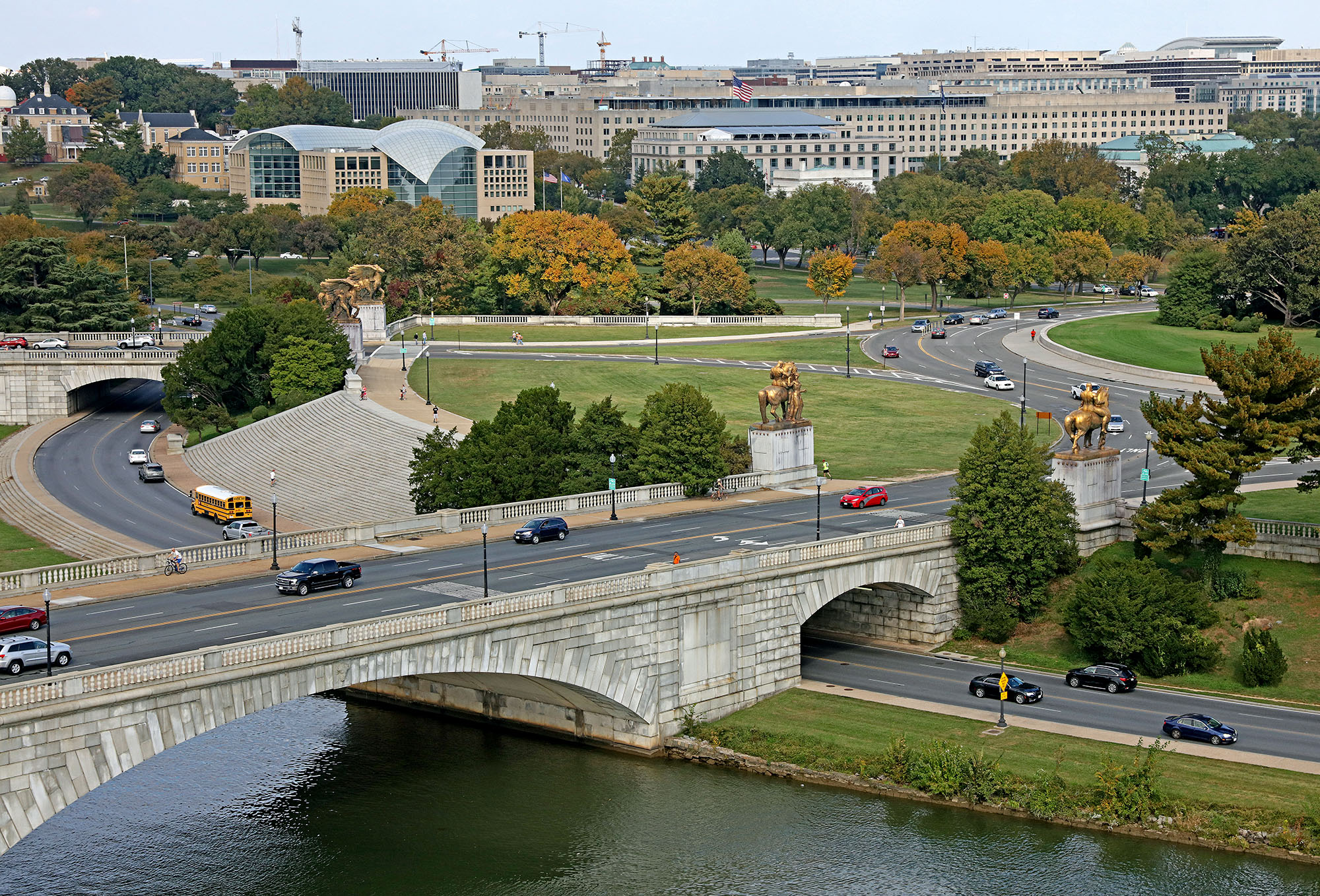
Arlington Memorial Bridge; East Entrance, Looking NE

The northeastern entrance to the Arlington Memorial Bridge features The Arts of War sculptures, Sacrifice and Valor, which were completed by Leo Friedlander in 1951. One of which was cast by Ferdinando Marinelli Artistic Foundry of Florence, Italy. On the pylons of each pier of the bridge are large circular discs with eagles and fasces designed by sculptor Carl Paul Jennewein.

The closest Metro station to the bridge is Arlington Cemetery. The bridge connects, both literally and symbolically, the Lincoln Memorial and Arlington House, the former home of Civil War General Robert E. Lee. This placement was done intentionally to represent the reunification of the North and the South.

At the southwestern terminus on Columbia Island, the bridge and its connecting roadways connect with the George Washington Memorial Parkway, State Route 27 and State Route 110. At the northeastern terminus, the bridge and its connecting roadways connect with Constitution Avenue, Independence Avenue, the Rock Creek and Potomac Parkway, and the District of Columbia segment of Interstate 66.

A peculiarity of the traffic circle at the southwestern terminus is that traffic already in the circle must yield to traffic entering the circle — the opposite of the standard rule. During morning rush hour, a portion of the traffic circle is closed to prevent mergers that would otherwise tie up rush hour traffic.

The center portion of the bridge was originally a metal draw span, intended to allow large vessels to pass upriver to Georgetown. However, with the construction of the Theodore Roosevelt Bridge immediately upstream, which has no such provision, the draw mechanism was abandoned. It was opened for the last time on February 28, 1961. The bascule leaves were to be counterbalanced with scrap steel embedded in concrete, but during the Great Depression there was not enough scrap available for the project. A ship load of Swedish iron ore eventually provided the 2,400 short tons (2,200 t) needed for the counterweights.

Arlington Memorial Bridge was added to the National Register of Historic Places on April 4, 1980.

== Renovation history ==
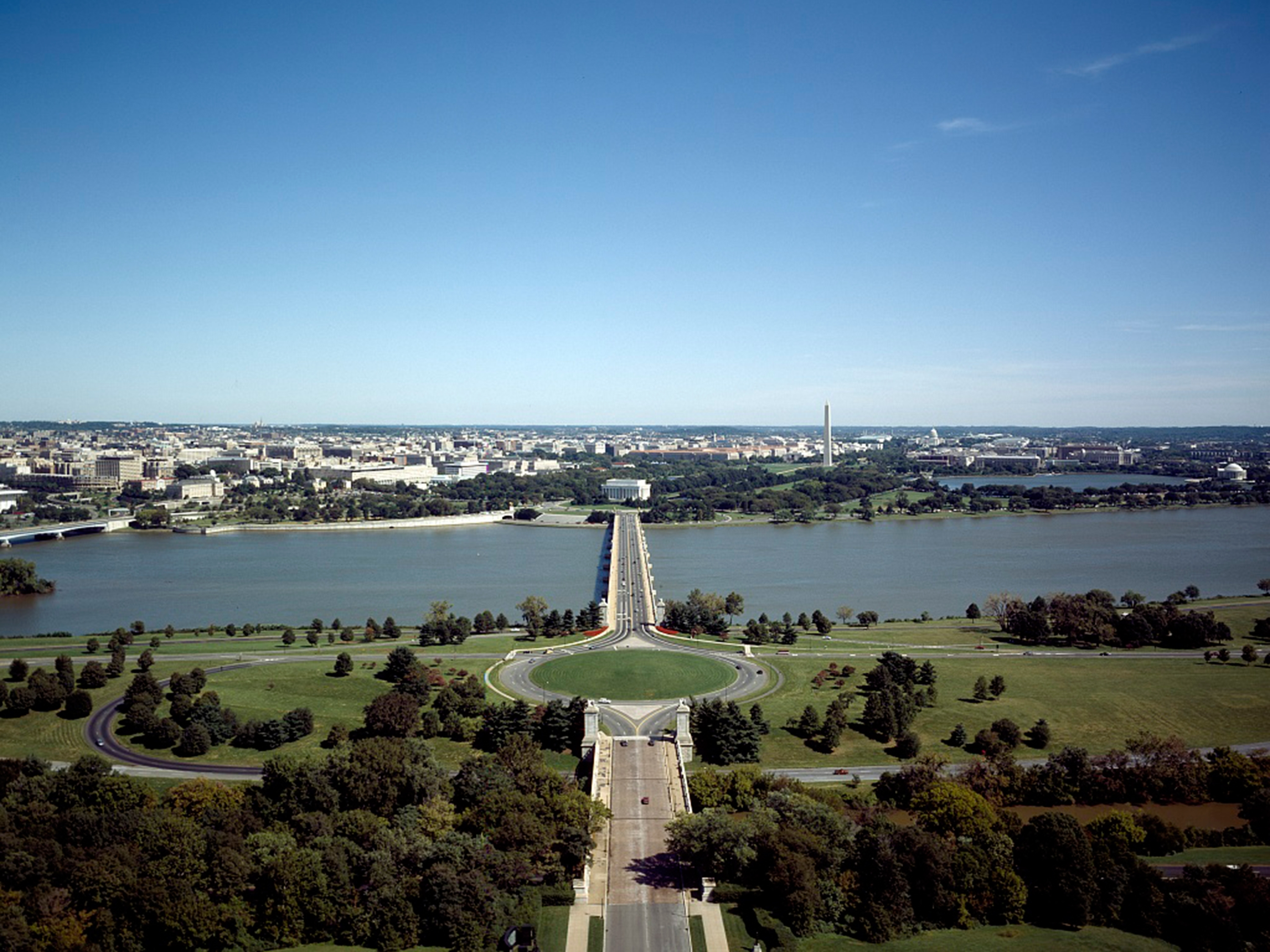
Aerial view looking east across the Arlington Memorial Bridge towards the Lincoln Memorial

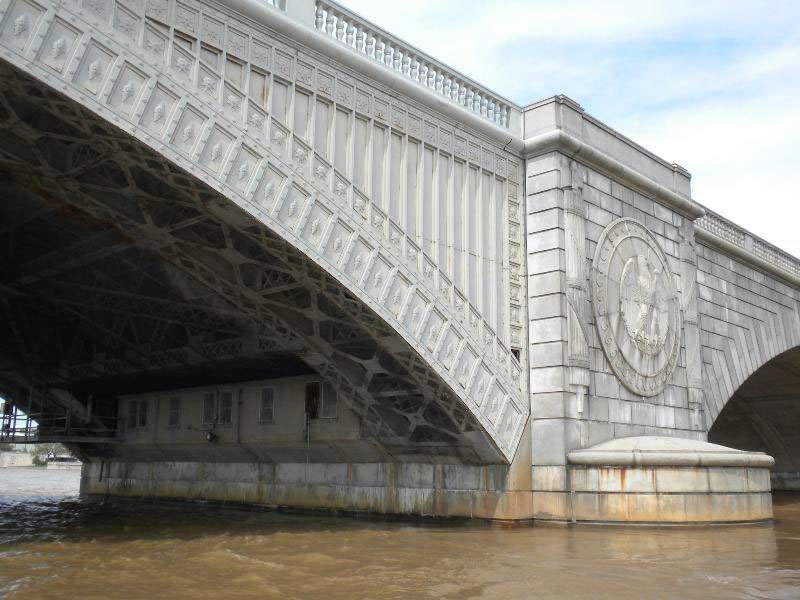
Bascule span of Arlington Memorial Bridge

The bridge was damaged during floods in March 1936 when water infiltrated and caused shorts in the bridge's electrical equipment. Repairs were made in late 1938 and early 1939. The Electrical Underground Construction Co. of New York City received $9,245 to replace damaged electrical equipment and wiring, install new electrical conduits, and install two sump pumps. In October 1936, a gear and a crankshaft in the drawbridge broke. The bridge was closed for nine hours while crews rushed to repair the span, which was open and unable to permit traffic. The closing, the Washington Post reported, was the longest since the bridge opened.

Major maintenance and repair work on the bridge first occurred in 1939. The draw span was repainted, the bridge repaved, the west engine room heated, and the granite on the Virginia abutments repointed and cleaned. This led to complete six-hour closures on August 30, August 31, and September 1.

In 1945, the bridge closed for two hours while workers attended to a jammed draw span. The bridge closed again on the evening of August 2, 1947, and most of the day on August 3 while workers replaced a gear and shaft that kept the draw span from vibrating when crossed by traffic. The National Park Service (NPS) said it was the second-longest closing in the bridge's history.

Major work occurred again in 1951. The granite blocks on the roadway surface were removed, and the bridged replaced with asphalt (a safer material) in a $207,000 repaving project. The work began on July 16, 1951. Several of the bridge's six lanes were closed during the work week, and the entire bridge closed to traffic on weekends for four weeks in a row. The Corson and Gruman Co. performed the work. Minor repaving occurred again in July 1957.

Beginning in March 1964, at least one lane of the six-lane bridge was closed every day while repairs were made to the draw span. However, the bridge never fully closed.

Additional work on the bridge occurred in November 1976. The draw span was immobilized and sealed, and the approaches on both ends of the bridge repaired. Three lanes in the direction of heaviest traffic flow were kept open during rush hour, but only one lane in the opposite direction. At all other times, only one lane in each direction was open. These repairs lasted several weeks.

A major repair effort occurred in the summer of 1985. The work involved resurfacing the bridge and renovating some of its safety and other features. The $4.7 million construction project, which involved the closure of two lanes in each direction, was conducted by A.A. Beiro Construction Co. To help speed work, the company received a $4,000-a-day bonus for each day it finished ahead of schedule.

Work began the first week of April 1985 and ended September 25.

Preservation and repair work was performed on the bridge's sidewalks in January 2011, which led to the closure of two lanes in each direction during daytime non-rush hours. The center lanes were closed for a few days in March 2012 for additional rehabilitation work. In June 2012, Cianbro Corp. oversaw an eight-week, $788,000 project to repair the bridge's deck, restore granite curbs, and replace sidewalks at both approaches. At least one lane (and sometimes two) in each direction was closed in September, October, and November.

Despite these various projects, as of 2012 the bridge had never had a major overhaul. That year, a report by the Federal Highway Administration (FHWA) called for a complete overhaul of Arlington Memorial Bridge.

=== 2013 and 2015 inspections ===
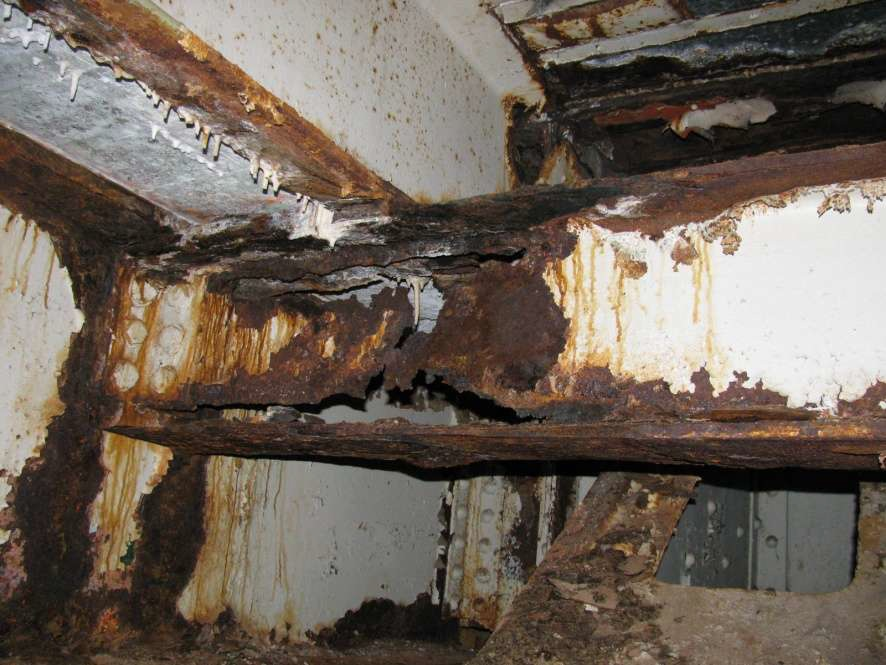
Severely rusted girder near the Arlington Memorial Bridge bascule span in 2013

In February 2013, the FHWA launched a major inspection of the bridge's deck. In April, National Park Service transportation division head Charles N. Borders II declared, "The bridge ... is really at the end of, and beyond, its life cycle". (Note: Ellipsis in original.) The inspection was performed on April 24, 2013, by the Federal Lands Bridge Office, an arm of the FHWA. In its post-inspection report, the FHWA declared the bridge to be "in poor condition overall due to continuing problems related to corrosion of the steel in the bascule span, deterioration of the concrete in the arch spans, and deterioration of the sidewalks and wearing surface." Among the problems noted in the report: moderate amounts of rusting were found on all the bridge's load-bearing beams, there were moderate to widespread cracks in the reinforced concrete arch spans, metal flakes (or "spalls") were coming off the steel beams on the road deck's underside, and the drainage system was clogged in many places by debris or rust.

The Washington Post reported that without immediate action, truck and bus traffic over the bridge could be banned within five years. However, the park service had yet to budget for any repairs. Borders suggested that if Congress were to immediately fund the bridge's complete overhaul, a two- to four-year reconstruction could begin as early as 2016. Repair options, which ranged from $125 million to $250 million in cost, included replacing the draw span with a fixed span and either closing the bridge completely for 40 to 100 days or keeping it partially open for four years.

In January 2015, the FHWA and NPS released an Arlington Memorial Bridge rehabilitation environmental assessment. It declared the bridge safe for all traffic, but warned that deterioration "continues to progress at a rapid pace." The report cautioned that the bascule span was in particularly bad shape: "Overall, the superstructure of the bascule span of Arlington Memorial Bridge is in fair to poor condition with areas of severe deterioration."

=== 2015 lane closures ===
On May 15, 2015, the National Park Service suddenly closed one lane of the bridge for an indeterminate amount of time to conduct a critical corrosion inspection of the bridge.

The inspection uncovered corrosion to the bascule span. FHWA engineers determined that it was no longer safe for traffic to pass along the outer lanes of the bascule span; consequently, these two lanes were closed to traffic on the evening of May 28, 2015. Moreover, experts discovered that corrosion had so affected secondary support beams throughout the rest of the bridge that they imposed a limit of 10 short tons (9.1 t) per vehicle, essentially barring most buses from crossing. Law enforcement agencies with jurisdiction over the bridge said they would begin stopping overweight vehicles to educate drivers about the new load limits, but would not ticket drivers for several weeks to give the "education period" time to work. (Note: NPS officials said about 150 buses cross Arlington Memorial Bridge each day.) Engineers also closed a 4-foot (1.2 m) strip of sidewalk on either side of the bridge out of structural concerns.

While the weight limit was indefinite (pending full rehabilitation of the bridge), NPS officials said the lanes and sidewalks would be closed six to nine months to allow workers to shore up the corroded beams and bascule span. The Department of Transportation issued a call for bids on May 26, 2015, and said a contractor will be chosen on June 18. The $5 million project is to cover repair or replacement of expansion joints, steel, structural concrete; drainage improvements; concrete sidewalk repair; restoration of the asphalt atop the bridge deck; and debris removal. Cianbro Corp. of Maine, which rehabbed the bridge a decade earlier, won a $2.5 million contract to begin the repairs, which were estimated to take about six months to complete. (The work was only to allow lane re-openings, but not remove the 10-ton weight limit.) Work was to begin on the bridge in late August or early September 2015.

In a July 2016 statement issued jointly by the offices of Senators Mark Warner and Tim Kaine; Representatives Don Beyer, Gerald Connolly, and Barbara Comstock; and Delegate Eleanor Holmes Norton, the NPS planned to repair the bridge in two phases. The first phase, which addressed the bridge's most urgent repairs, refurbished and reinforced the approach spans on either end of the bridge at a cost of $166 million. These repairs will permit the bridge to stay open until 2030. The second phase, whose cost was estimated at $94 million, were to replace the bascule span and make other repairs to the bridge.

On July 5, 2016, the U.S. Department of Transportation awarded a $90 million grant from its Fostering Advancements in Shipping and Transportation for the Long-term Achievement of National Efficiencies (FASTLANE) program to the National Park Service and the District of Columbia to permit repairs to the bridge to begin. The grant was conditional on finding an additional $36 million in matching funds for project, funds which can come from other federal non-transportation funds or from local funds. A joint statement by the group of congresspeople said the FASTLANE grant would enable NPS to begin engineering planning and issue contracts, with an eye toward beginning construction in early 2017.

=== 2018 major renovation ===
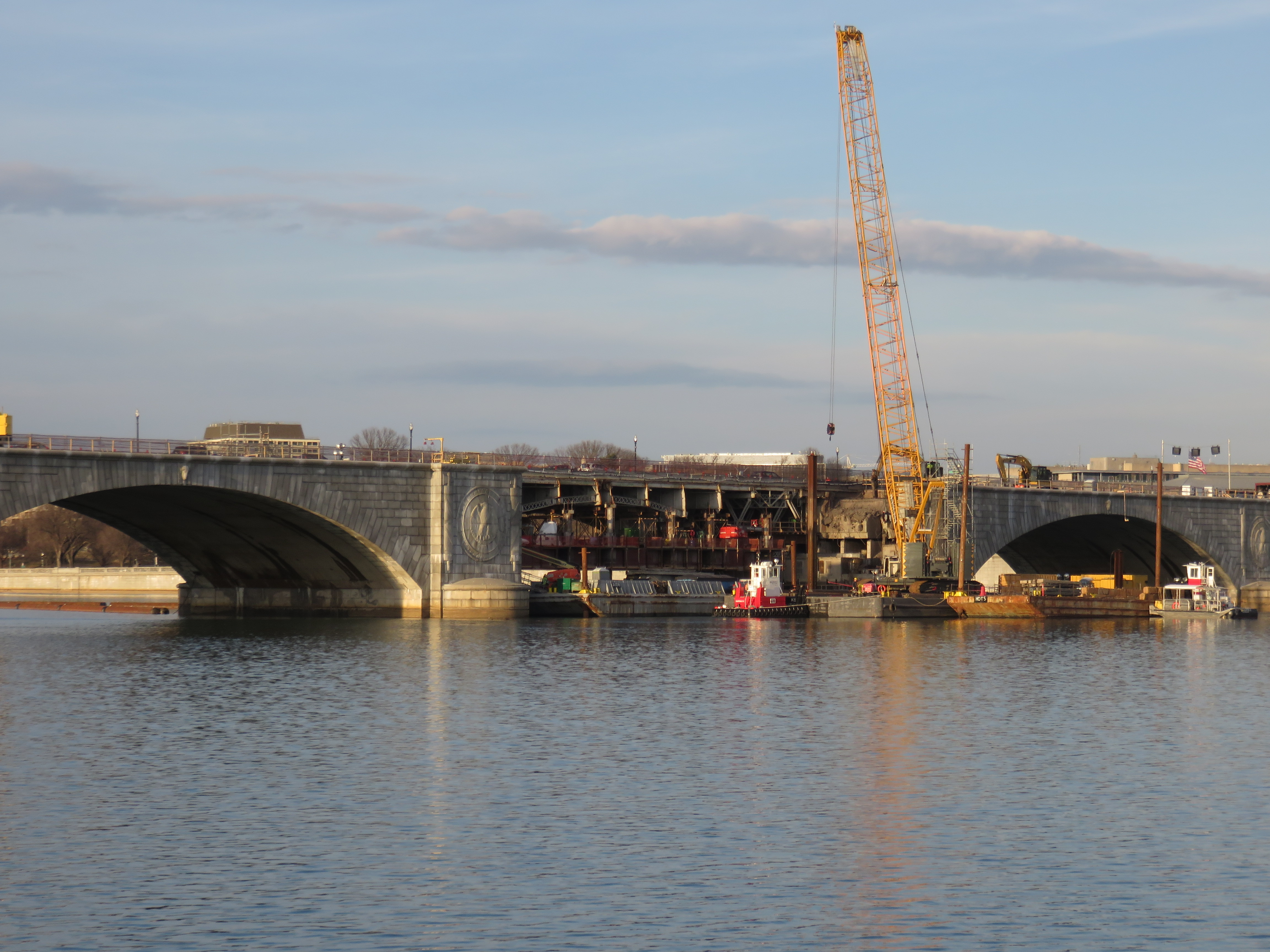
Replacement of the draw span in 2019

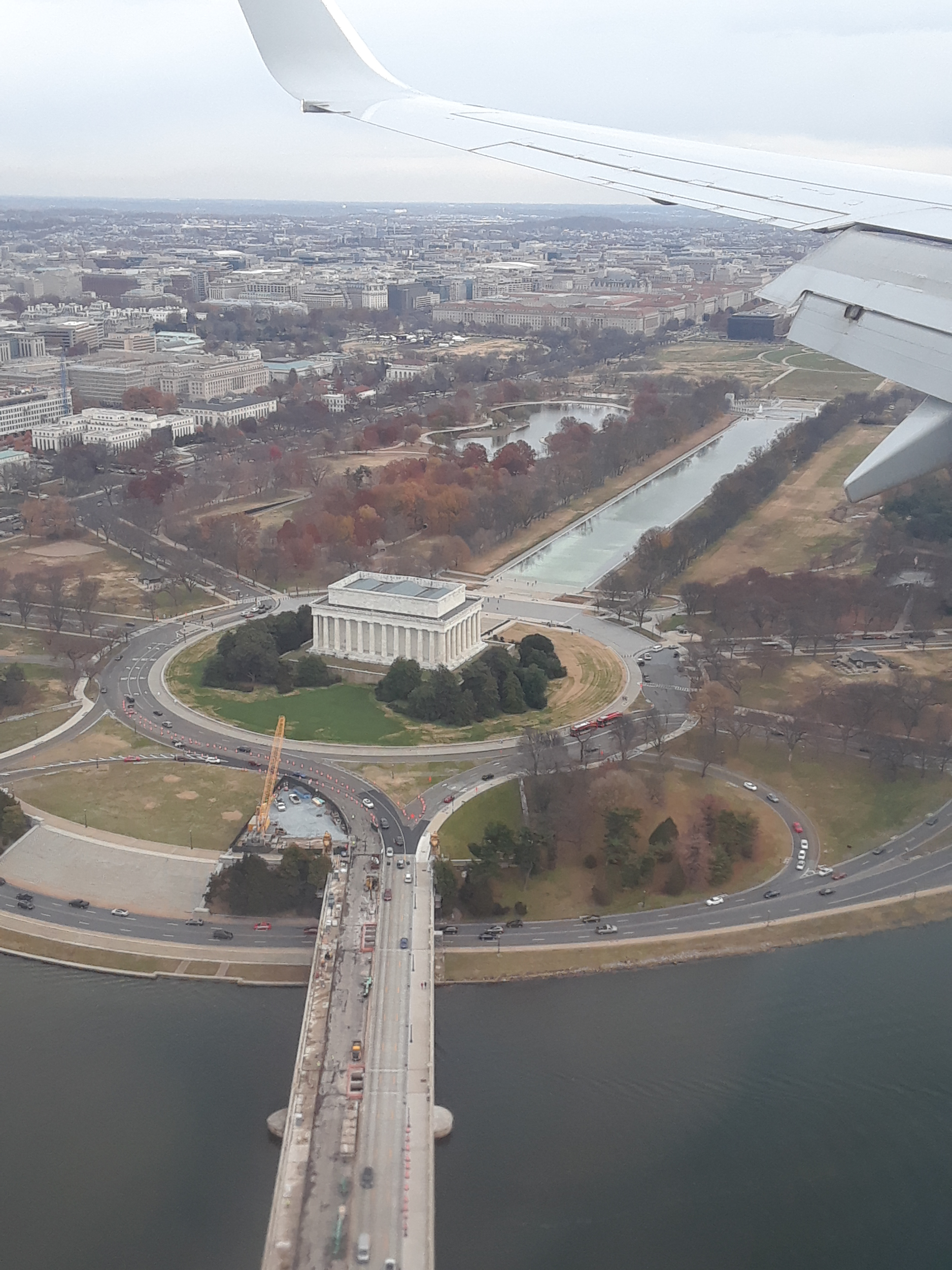
Bridge undergoing repairs

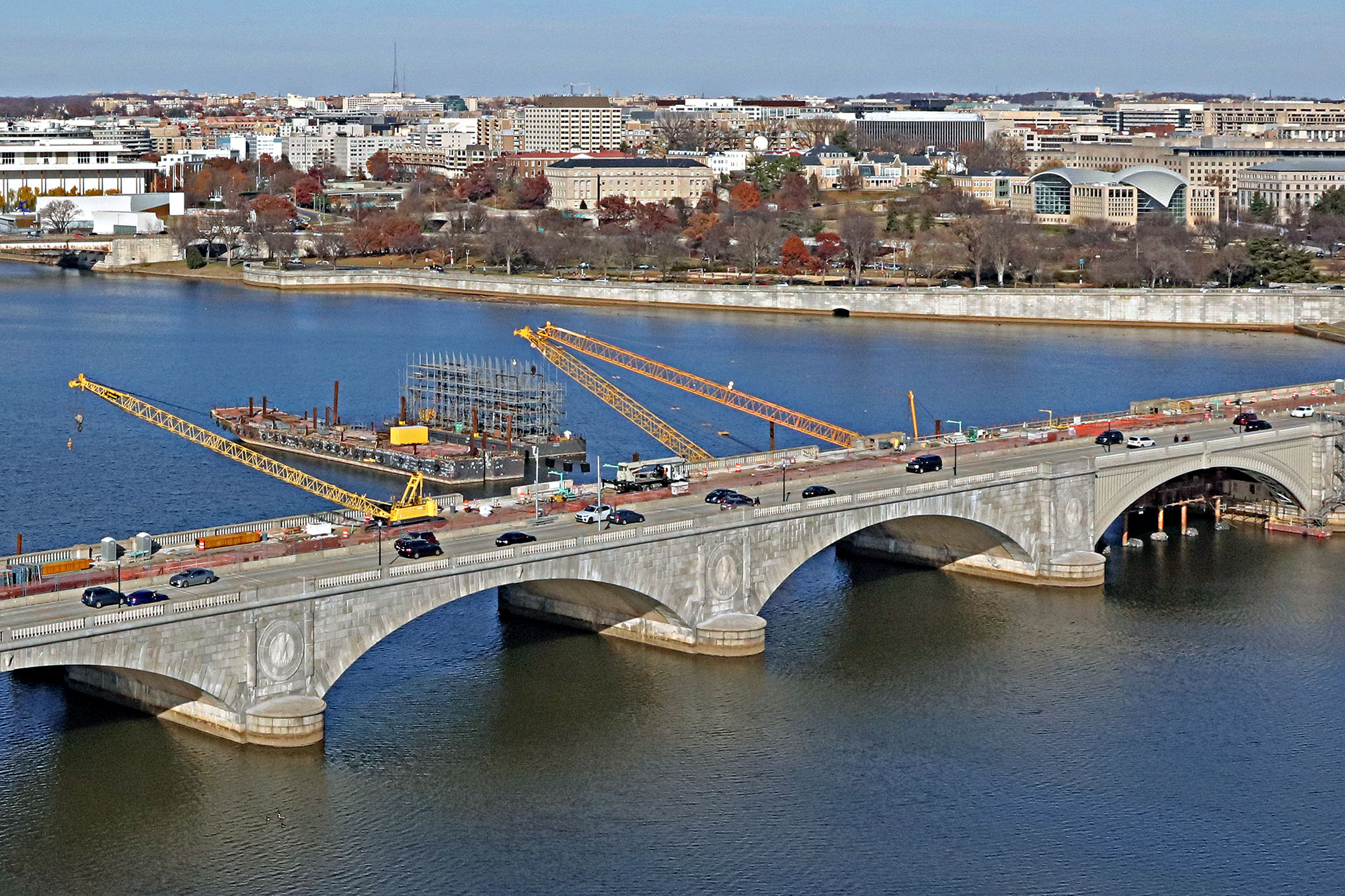
Arlington Memorial Bridge Under Repair in 2019

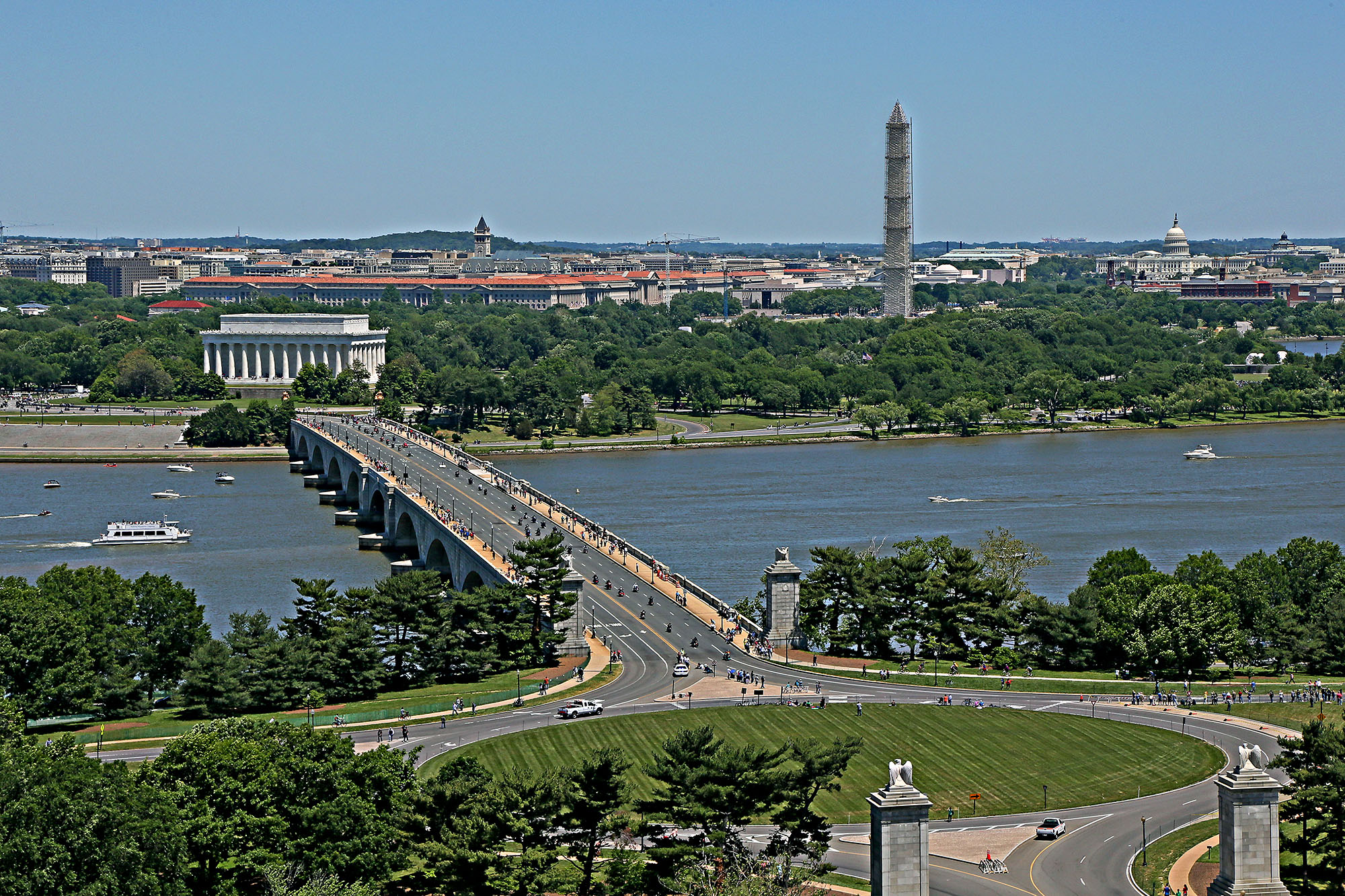
Arlington Memorial Bridge, Looking East

On November 30, 2017, a major renovation of the bridge was announced by the U.S. Department of the Interior. The $227 million ($298,200,000 in 2025 dollars) project was paid for from a wide range of federal funding sources, including a $30 million appropriation. The Federal Highway Administration said that Kiewit Infrastructure had received the contract for the work, which involved replacing the draw span, repairing the approaches, and replacing the deck. Construction began in 2018, and the renovated bridge fully reopened on December 4, 2020.

== In popular culture ==
Memorial Bridge is commonly depicted in films, television shows, and books set in the Washington, D.C. area. Among the films in which it makes an appearance include No Way Out, Argo, A Few Good Men, Evan Almighty, Airline Disaster, and Wedding Crashers.

== See also ==
- List of bridges documented by the Historic American Engineering Record in Washington, D.C.
- List of bridges on the National Register of Historic Places in Washington, D.C.
- National Register of Historic Places listings in Washington, D.C.
- Architecture of Washington, D.C.

== Bibliography ==
- Abrams, Brett L. (2009). Capital Sporting Grounds: A History of Stadium and Ballpark Construction in Washington, D.C. Jefferson, N.C.: McFarland. ISBN 9780786452507.
- Arlington Memorial Bridge Commission (1924). The Arlington Memorial Bridge. Washington, D.C.: Government Printing Office.
- Army Corps of Engineers (1915). Report of the Chief of Engineers U.S. Army, 1915. Washington, D.C.: Government Printing Office.
- Army Corps of Engineers (1918). Report of the Chief of Engineers. War Department Annual Reports, 1917. Vol. 2. Washington, D.C.: Government Printing Office.
- Bednar, Michael J. (2006). L'Enfant's Legacy: Public Open Spaces in Washington, D.C. Baltimore, Md.: Johns Hopkins University Press. ISBN 9780801883187.
- Cocks, Catherine (2009). The A to Z of the Progressive Era. Lanham, Md.: Rowman & Littlefield. ISBN 9780810870697.
- Gutheim, Frederick A.; Lee, Antoinette J. (2006). Worthy of the Nation: Washington, D.C., From L'Enfant to the National Capital Planning Commission. Baltimore, Md.: Johns Hopkins University Press. ISBN 0801883288.
- Horne, Robert C. (1956). "Bridges Across the Potomac". Records of the Columbia Historical Society: 249–258.
- King, Floyd (1901). "Statement of General Floyd King". Proposed Memorial Bridge: A Hearing Before the Senate Committee on the District of Columbia, January 16, 1901. Committee on the District of Columbia. U.S. Senate. 57th Cong., spec. sess. Washington, D.C.: Government Printing Office.
- Kohler, Sue A. (1996). The Commission of Fine Arts: A Brief History, 1910–1995. Washington, D.C.: United States Commission of Fine Arts. hdl:2027/mdp.39015038570746.
- Peterson, Jon A. (2003). The Birth of City Planning in the United States: 1840–1917. Baltimore, Md.: The Johns Hopkins University Press. ISBN 9780801872105.
- Peterson, Jon A. (2006). "The Senate Park Commission Plan for Washington, D.C.: A New Vision for the Capital and the Nation". In Kohler, Sue A.; Scott, Pamela (eds.). Designing the Nation's Capital: The 1901 Plan for Washington, D.C. Washington, D.C.: US Commission of Fine Arts. hdl:2027/mdp.39015064990909. ISBN 9780160752230.
- Scott, Pamela (2006). "'A City Designed As A Work of Art': The Emergence of the Senate Park Commission's Monumental Core". In Kohler, Sue A.; Scott, Pamela (eds.). Designing the Nation's Capital: The 1901 Plan for Washington, D.C. Washington, D.C.: US Commission of Fine Arts. hdl:2027/mdp.39015064990909. ISBN 9780160752230.
- Scott, Pamela; Lee, Antoinette J. (1993). Buildings of the District of Columbia. New York City: Oxford University Press. ISBN 0195093895.
- Sherrill, C.O. (1921). First Deficiency Appropriation Bill, 1922. Hearings Before the Subcommittee of the Committee on Appropriations on H.R. 9237. Subcommittee on Appropriations. Committee on Appropriations. U.S. Senate. 67th Cong., 2d sess. Washington, D.C.: Government Printing Office.
- Tindall, William (1914). Standard History of the City of Washington From a Study of the Original Sources. Knoxville, Tenn.: H.W. Crew & Co.
- Tompkins, Sally K. (1993). A Quest for Grandeur: Charles Moore and the Federal Triangle. Washington, D.C.: Smithsonian Institution Press. ISBN 9781560981619.
