= Rock Creek and Potomac Parkway =

Parkway in Washington D.C.

- Map of the District of Columbia with Rock Creek Parkway highlighted in red

Route information
- Maintained by NPS
- Length: 2.9 mi (4.7 km)
- Existed: 1944–present
- Restrictions: No trucks

Major junctions
- South end: Lincoln Memorial Circle on the National Mall
- I-66 in Foggy Bottom; US 29 in West End
- North end: Shoreham / Beach Drives in Rock Creek Park

Location
- Country: United States
- Federal district: District of Columbia

Highway system
- Streets and Highways of Washington, DC; Interstate; US; DC; State-Named Streets
- Rock Creek and Potomac Parkway Historic District
- U.S. National Register of Historic Places
- Location: Rock Creek and Potomac Parkway, Washington, D.C.
- Coordinates: 38°54′47″N 77°3′16″W
- Area: 0 acres (0 ha)
- Built: 1889
- Architect: Olmsted, Frederick Law, Jr.; Langdon, James G.
- Architectural style: Designed Historic Landscape
- MPS: Parkways of the National Capital Region MPS
- NRHP reference No.: 05000367
- Added to NRHP: May 4, 2005

The Rock Creek and Potomac Parkway, informally called the Rock Creek Parkway, is a parkway maintained by the National Park Service as part of Rock Creek Park in Washington, D.C. It runs next to the Potomac River and Rock Creek in a generally north–south direction, carrying four lanes of traffic from the Lincoln Memorial and Arlington Memorial Bridge north to a junction with Beach Drive near Connecticut Avenue at Calvert Street, N.W., just south of the National Zoological Park. During rush hours, the parkway is converted to one-way traffic corresponding to the peak direction of travel: southbound in the morning and northbound in the afternoon.

The Parkway was listed on the National Register of Historic Places on May 4, 2005. Built from 1923 to 1936, it is "one of the best-preserved examples of the earliest stage of motor parkway development".

== Route description ==
View north on the parkway at the Lincoln Memorial Circle, including the sculpture group The Arts of Peace

Time-lapse video of a northbound trip on the Rock Creek and Potomac Parkway and Beach Drive

The Parkway has two points of origination on its southern end, one at the traffic circle around the Lincoln Memorial, and the other at the intersection of Ohio Drive and Independence Avenue. The most common access is from Independence Avenue. Access from the Lincoln Memorial circle is primarily via a loop ramp for traffic leaving the Arlington Memorial Bridge on its south side, though traffic from Constitution Avenue can enter from the other side of the circle via a spur known as Parkway Drive. There is also a ramp, though only signed for Independence Avenue, from the Interstate 66 Theodore Roosevelt Bridge. Before I-66 was built, Constitution Avenue ran to the parkway, with Ohio Drive ending there. The entrance on Parkway Drive is framed by two monumental statues, Music and Harvest and Aspiration and Literature, which together form a group known as The Arts of Peace. They were designed by James Earle Fraser and erected in 1951.

After passing under the Roosevelt Bridge, the parkway passes the Kennedy Center for Performing Arts, including an at-grade intersection with F Street Northwest north of the building. Prior to the building of the Kennedy Center, New Hampshire Avenue ran to the parkway. Beyond F Street, the parkway runs past the Watergate building; there it intersects Virginia Avenue, which provides easy access to and from the Potomac River Freeway (I-66). The Potomac River sweeps to the west at approximately this point; the parkway continues along its rough north–south path and instead parallels the small Potomac tributary of Rock Creek.

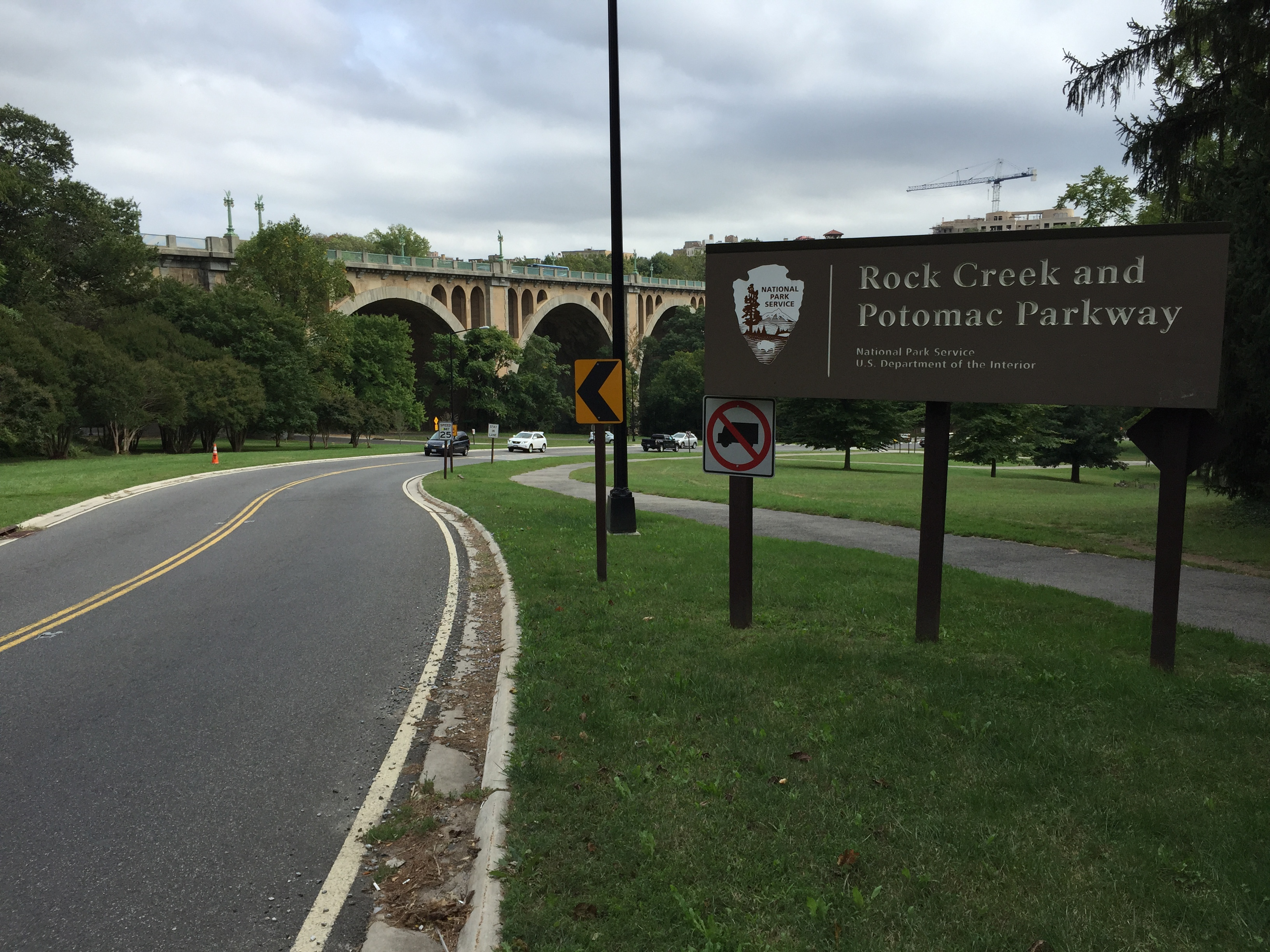
View south at the north end of the parkway

Past Virginia Avenue, the parkway has many characteristics of a freeway, most notably limited access by ramp. The first interchange is with K Street Northwest, lying inside the newer Whitehurst Freeway/Potomac River Freeway interchange. Due to the partial nature of the interchange, some movements are made via Virginia Avenue instead. Just to the west, K Street crosses Rock Creek over the L Street Bridge, with the Whitehurst Freeway overhead and separate side bridges for the ramps to and from the northbound Parkway. After K Street, the parkway crosses Rock Creek, paralleling it to the west for a while.

Pennsylvania Avenue crosses over the parkway and the creek on a combined bridge, with a single-loop ramp from the southbound parkway to Pennsylvania Avenue eastbound. Just to the north, M Street Northwest crosses the parkway and creek together, with no access between the roads.

Further north, P Street Northwest crosses the parkway and creek, with ramps from P Street to the parkway northbound and southbound and from the southbound parkway to P Street. Just after crossing under P Street, the parkway crosses to the east side of the creek on the Bridge near P Street, and a northbound onramp from P Street merges. It passes under Q Street Northwest's Dumbarton Bridge over the creek with no access.

The Charles C. Glover Bridge carries Massachusetts Avenue over the parkway and creek. Access to and from the south is provided via Waterside Drive, which merges into the parkway at a Y interchange. To the north, Waterside Drive merges back into the parkway, providing for all movements but a southbound offramp. Soon after, the parkway again crosses to the west side of the creek on the Shoreham Hill Bridge.

The end of the parkway is near an intersection with Beach Drive, which continues generally northward along the creek. A left turn from southbound Rock Creek Parkway provides access to Beach Drive from local roads. Just north of Beach Drive, the parkway again splits, with Cathedral Avenue heading northeast next to Beach Drive under the William H. Taft Bridge and Duke Ellington Bridge (Connecticut Avenue and Calvert Street), and the parkway becoming 24th Street Northwest at Calvert Street, with easy access to Connecticut Avenue. Cathedral Avenue is one-way at the same times as the parkway. Beach Drive continues as a two-lane road parallel to Rock Creek, enters a tunnel under a hill, passes the National Zoo, and continues towards Maryland.

Trucks and other commercial vehicles are barred from the parkway. The parkway has been used as part of state funeral processions between the United States Capitol and the Washington National Cathedral.

== One-way operation ==
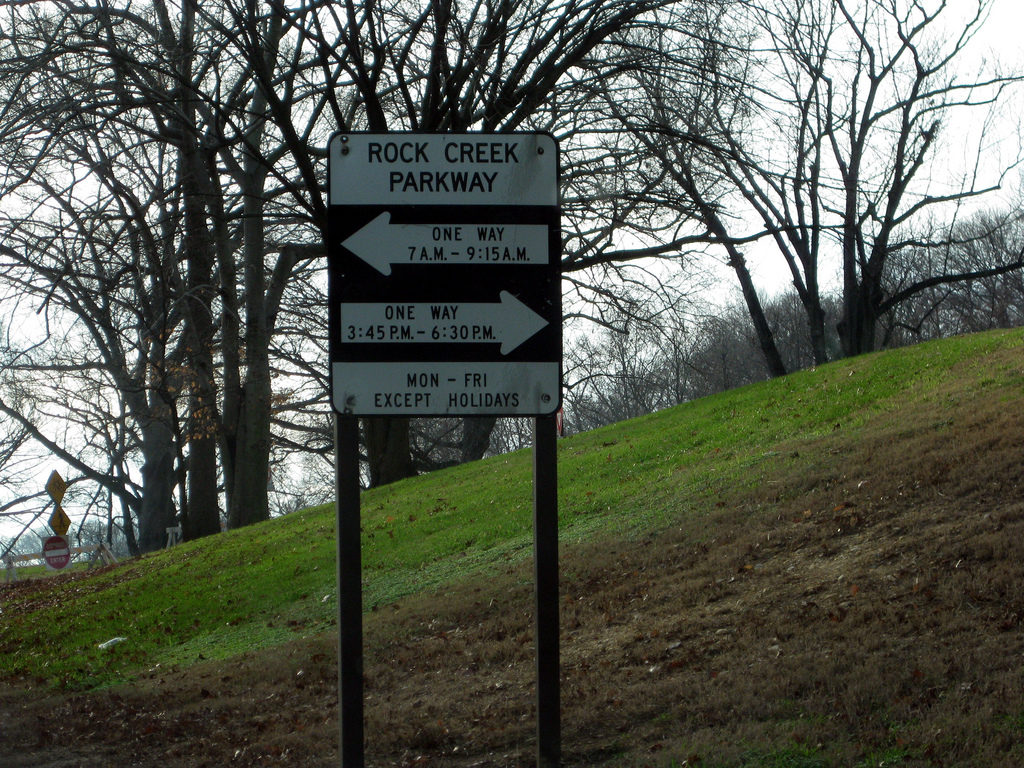
Sign indicates the times during which the Parkway is one-way.

During rush hours, a reversible lane setup is used between Ohio Drive and Connecticut Avenue to permit all lanes to be used for the predominant direction of travel. The parkway first became one-way during rush hours on Valentine's Day 1938.

The parkway is posted one-way southbound on weekdays from 6:45 a.m. to 9:30 a.m., and one-way northbound from 3:45 p.m. to 6:30 p.m., federal holidays excepted. The changeover requires four to five United States Park Police officers to travel the length of the parkway on motorcycle, manually placing barricades and cones and directing traffic. As each changeover takes 30 minutes, in practice the effective time of one-way operation is roughly two hours per day in each direction.

=== Safety ===
The one-way arrangement has been criticized as confusing and unusual. (Full roadway reversals are rare in the United States; more common are individual reversible lanes, such as those found locally on Interstate 395 in Virginia) After the District of Columbia eliminated the reversible peak-hour lane setup on Connecticut Avenue in 2020, the National Park Service began exploring a similar idea for Rock Creek Parkway.

In 2024, a Department of Transportation study found that crashes are disproportionately higher during the one-way periods, due to the heavy traffic and antiquated construction of the parkway, and identified several other design and signage factors that contribute to driver confusion. The barricades preventing wrong-way entry are simple wooden sawhorses with signs attached so they can be moved easily; Park Police officers state it is common for drivers to illegally move them themselves. The study recommended discontinuing one-way operation and adding construction to reduce anticipated traffic backups. The National Park Service plans to begin collecting public feedback for its environmental assessment over the winter of 2024-25.

== Major intersections ==
The entire route is in Washington, D.C.

Location	mi	km	Destinations	Notes
National Mall	0.00	0.00	Independence Avenue SW / Ohio Drive SW – Memorials	At-grade intersection
National Mall	0.28	0.45	Memorial Bridge – Virginia, Arlington Cemetery	
Foggy Bottom			I-66 / E Street Expressway	No southbound exit
Foggy Bottom	0.42	0.68	Kennedy Center	At-grade intersections; no left turn southbound
Foggy Bottom	0.92	1.48	Virginia Avenue NW to I-66 / E Street Expressway – Kennedy Center, Thompson Boat Center	At-grade intersection; no left turn northbound
West End	1.03	1.66	K Street NW / Whitehurst Freeway (US 29 south)	
Rock Creek Park	1.17	1.88	Pennsylvania Avenue NW east	Southbound exit only
Rock Creek Park	1.62– 1.77	2.61– 2.85	P Street NW	No northbound exit
Rock Creek Park	1.99– 2.62	3.20– 4.22	Massachusetts Avenue NW (via Waterside Drive NW)	No southbound exit
Rock Creek Park	2.90	4.67	Beach Drive NW / Cathedral Avenue NW / Connecticut Avenue NW – National Zoo	At-grade intersection; access via Shoreham Drive NW
1.000 mi = 1.609 km; 1.000 km = 0.621 mi: Incomplete access

== Trail ==
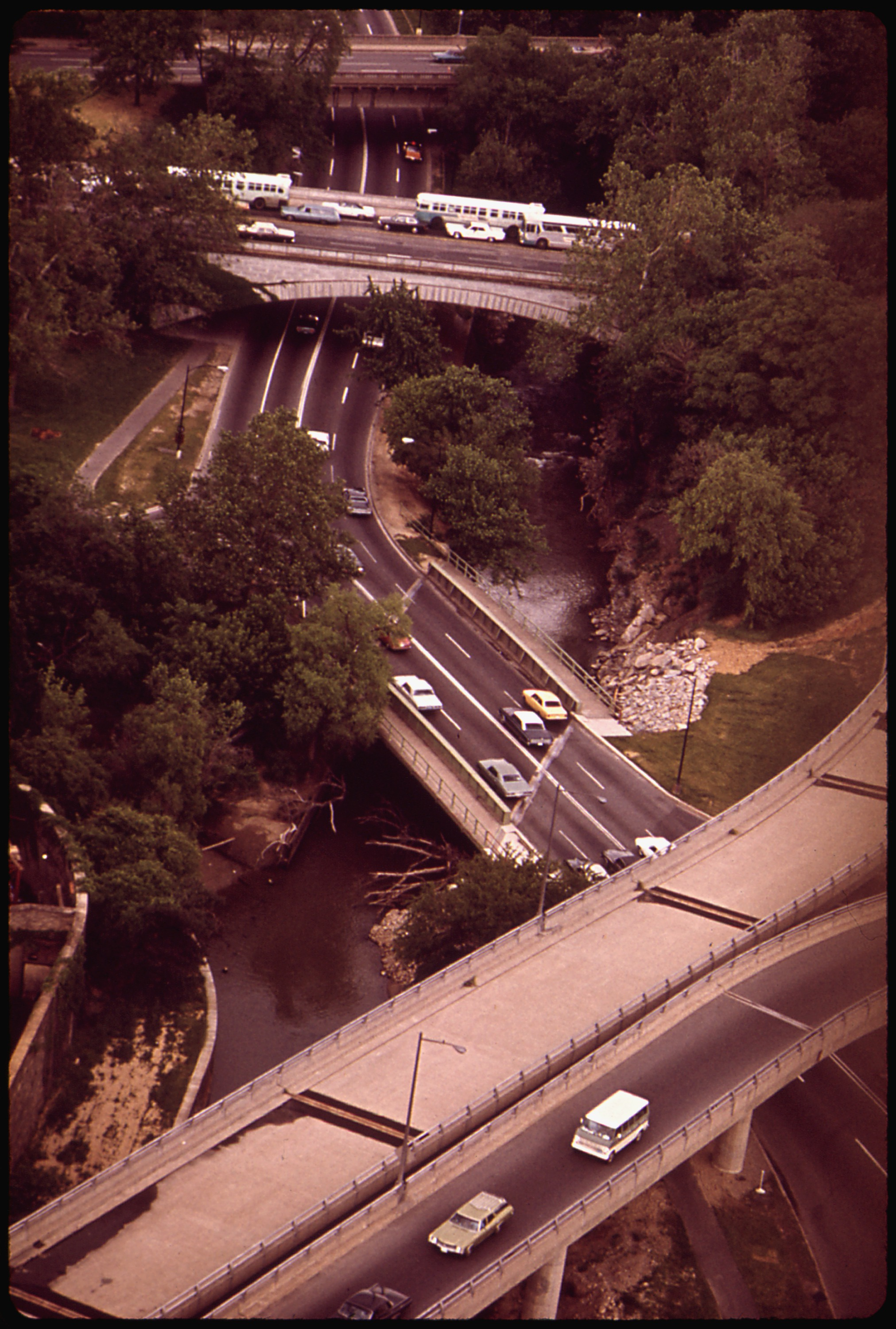
Aerial view of the L Street Bridge and Rock Creek Parkway Trail, at center, 1973

The Rock Creek Park Trail runs along the Parkway from the Lincoln Memorial to Connecticut Avenue, where it continues along Beach Drive to Broad Branch Road. The trail continues north along Beach from Joyce Road to Bingham Drive.

The Shoreline section along the Potomac is the oldest section of the trail, built before 1967.

In 1971, the Park Service set aside a lane of the Parkway north of Virginia Avenue for a week to promote commuting by bicycle. The experiment was a success, but caused traffic jams, so the Park Service paved bridle paths immediately to the west that had existed since the park was founded. The trail was extended in September 1971 to Calvert Street, and then 2 miles (3.2 km) to Bluff Bridge in 1972.

In 1981-82, the parkway bridge over Rock Creek at L Street was replaced and as part of that project, a separate trail bridge was built. It replaced a narrow section of the existing bridge that then served as part of the bike path.

In 1997, the Shoreline Trail section was repaved and realigned.
