= P Street =

Street in Washington, D.C., United States

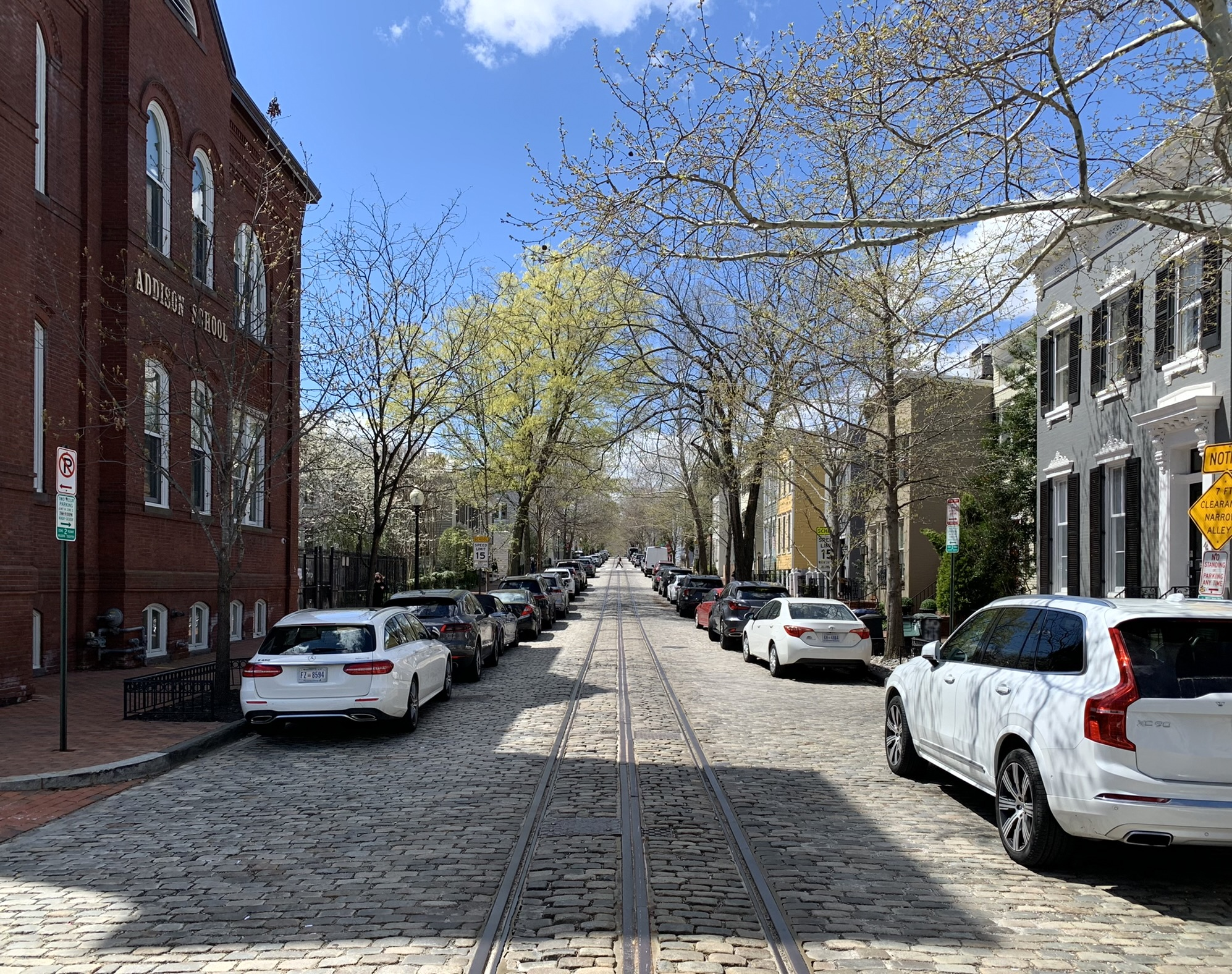
P Street NW in the Georgetown neighborhood in 2022

P Street refers to four different streets within the city of Washington, D.C. The streets were named by President George Washington in 1791 as part of a general street naming program, in which east–west running streets were named alphabetically and north–south running streets numerically.

== NW ==
P Street NW runs westerly from North Capitol Street to the eastern boundary of Georgetown University (at 37th Street NW), with an additional block-long section running from the western edge of Glover-Archbold Park to Foxhall Road NW. P Street NW crosses Rock Creek and the Rock Creek and Potomac Parkway via the P Street Bridge. P Street NW also crosses Dupont Circle and Logan Circle. This P Street is the oldest of the four: the northern boundary of the City of Washington in the District of Columbia, as surveyed in July 1795, listed the P Street ford at Rock Creek as the starting point of the city's original northern boundary. The first bridge to carry P Street over the creek was Paper Mill Bridge.

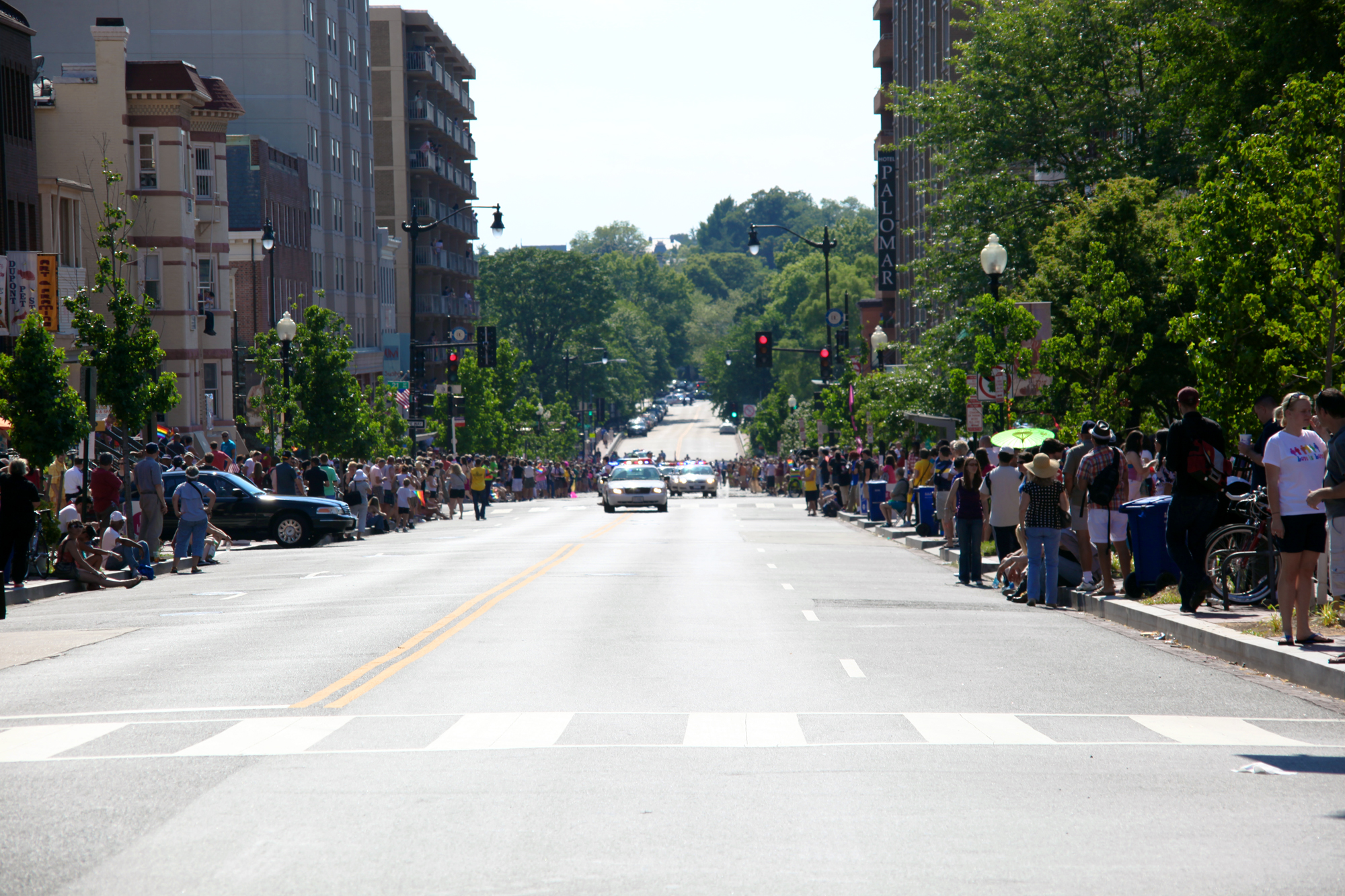
The 2000 and 2100 blocks of P Street NW in 2012

P Street NW was important both commercially and topographically. The P Street ford marked the farthest point at which ocean-going ships could travel up Rock Creek. Slash Run, a major tributary of Rock Creek, began at 1700 P Street. P Street NW was also home to the city's earliest free African American residents. One of the first free blacks to buy property in the city was Lethe Hill, who purchased a lot at P and 30th Streets in 1819. Another free black, William Becraft, bought a home a block away. In time, a large neighborhood of free blacks formed in a 10-block area bounded by P Street NW, Constitution Avenue NW, 16th Street NW, and 6th Street NW. In the 1890s, Riggs Market—one of the city's important (if smaller) markets—was located on P Street NW between 14th and 15th Streets NW. A church at 508 P Street NW, formerly the Zion Evangelical Lutheran Church, became Springfield Baptist Church in 1941. Gospel singer Edna Gallmon Cooke began her singing career there.

In 1885, Major General John A. Logan purchased the "Stone Mansion" on Iowa Circle and P Street NW. Three-time presidential candidate William J. Bryan later leased it from the Logans. Congress changed the circle's name to "Logan Circle" in December 1930 in Logan's honor. The Dupont Circle Citizens Association was founded in 1922 in a townhouse at 1767 P Street.

== NE ==
P Street NE runs westerly for a single block from North Capitol Street to Florida Avenue NE. Areas further east are occupied by the Amtrak railroad tracks, Union Market, Gallaudet University, Mount Olivet Cemetery, the United States National Arboretum, Anacostia Park, and the Anacostia River. It does not extend into the Deanwood neighborhood.

== SW ==
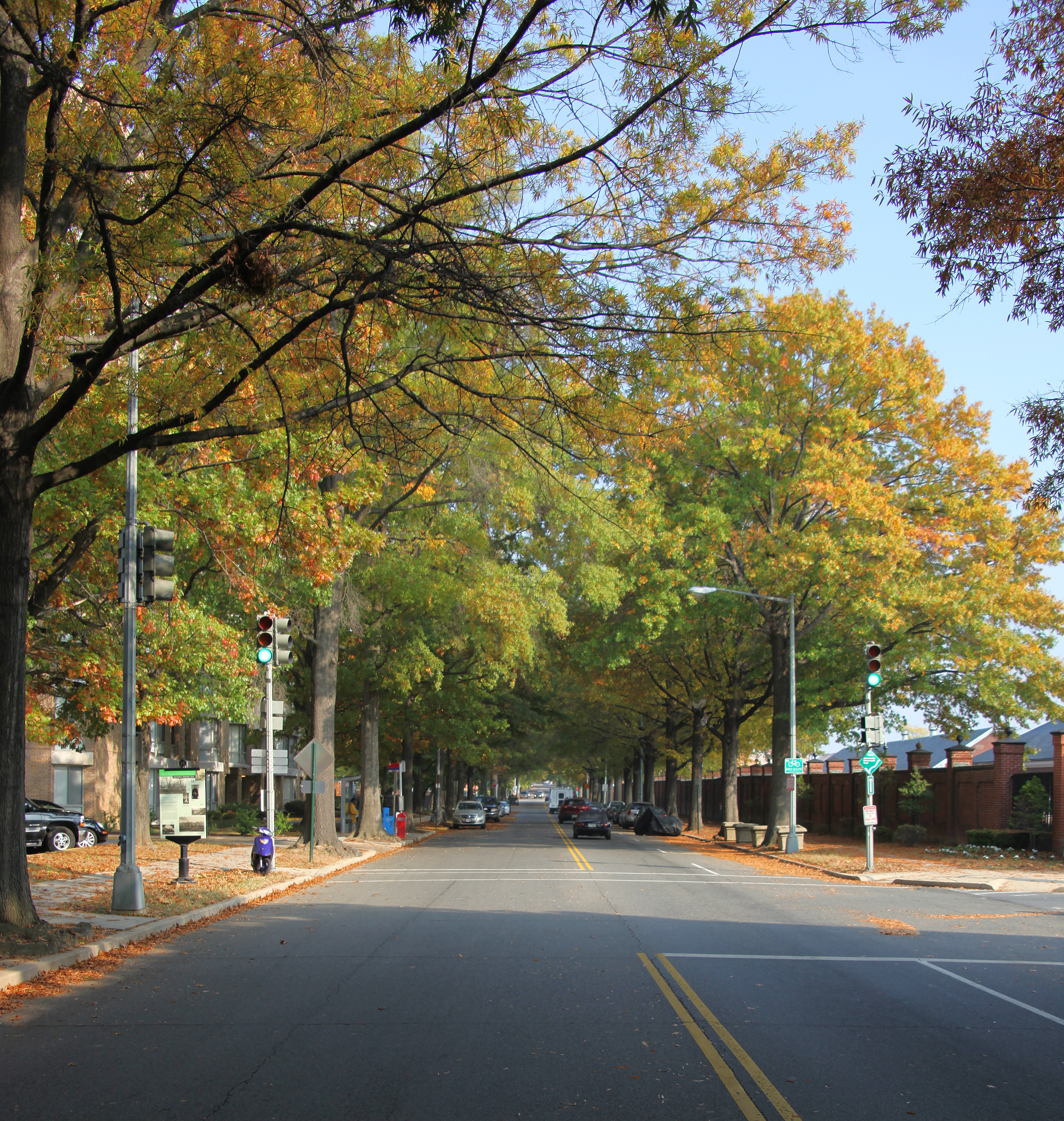
Looking east from the 300 block of P Street SW

P Street SW runs westerly from South Capitol Street to Southwest Waterfront Park, where it intersects with 4th Street SW. Along about half its length, on the south side of the street, is Fort Lesley J. McNair. The main entrance to the defense facility is on P Street SW. P Street SW lies within an area originally deeded to Charles Carroll the Settler in 1688, who sold it to Notley Young in 1770. Around 1792, Young sold the property to developer James Greenleaf, who platted it in 1794. Greenleaf built large residential townhomes along P Street SW in 1794-1795, but sold the property shortly afterward. The area bordering P Street passed through several hands, with the property becoming more and more fragmented over time. Benjamin G. Orr, the fourth mayor of the city, owned property on P Street SW between 4 and 4-1/2 Streets. He later sold some of it to Reverend Luther Rice and some to Secretary of the Treasury William H. Crawford. Two of the houses on this block of P Street were owned by Columbia College.

Navy Commodore John Rodgers purchased two of the homes on the far western end of P Street SW between 4th and 4-1/2 Streets SW, and connected the homes into a single dwelling. Rodgers' property extended to the Potomac River. This block became known as "Rodgers Row". In the early 1870s, the homes here were purchased and demolished by the Metropolitan Railroad to build its 4-1/2 Street Car Barn and Shop.

This streetcar barn was torn down in 1962 to allow for the construction of the Riverside Condominiums.

== SE ==
P Street SE is fragmented and truncated due to the topography of the eastern side of the Anacostia River. It runs westerly for two blocks between 18th Street NE and Naylor Road SE, and for about three blocks between Pennsylvania Avenue SE and Branch Avenue SE.
