= Key House =

Former house in Washington, D.C.

Coordinates: 38.9049°N 77.0700°W

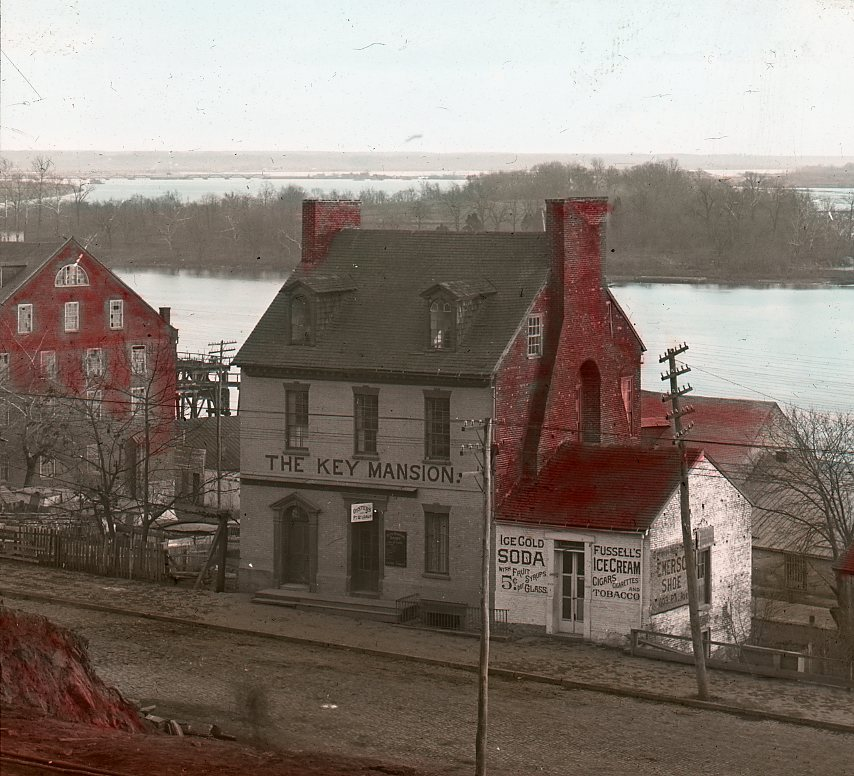
Key House in the late 19th-century

The Key House, also referred to as the Key Mansion, was the Washington, D.C., home of lawyer and poet Francis Scott Key from 1805 to 1830. It was built in 1795 and demolished in the 1940s for a highway ramp.

The Key House was built in 1795 by a real estate developer and merchant. At the time the house was located on Bridge Street, since renamed M Street, and included thick walls, long hallways, two parlors, and six bedrooms, in addition to the kitchen and dining room. Key and his wife moved there in 1805 and raised their 11 children in the house; during this time, he wrote the poem that would later be expanded and turned into the national anthem, "The Star-Spangled Banner".

The Keys moved after the Chesapeake and Ohio Canal was built directly behind their house, although Francis continued using the one-story addition as office space. The house later became a hotel and restaurant, then a string of commercial enterprises, including a blacksmith shop, and a dry-goods store. With the construction of the Georgetown Car Barn across the street, the area around the house rapidly developed.

In the early 1900s, a group of historic preservationists purchased the house and established a museum honoring Key, but within a few years, the building was sold and drastically altered. The gabled roof and chimneys were removed, in addition to other modifications. Many people thought the original house had been demolished and replaced with a new building. When the Key Bridge opened in 1923, it was apparent the house might not survive. This came to pass in the 1940s with the construction of an exit ramp from the Whitehurst Freeway to the Key Bridge. The building was disassembled with plans to rebuild it somewhere else, but during the next several decades, all of the items were used in other buildings or stolen. In 1993, the Francis Scott Key Memorial opened near the Key House site.

== History ==
=== 19th-century ===
==== Early history ====
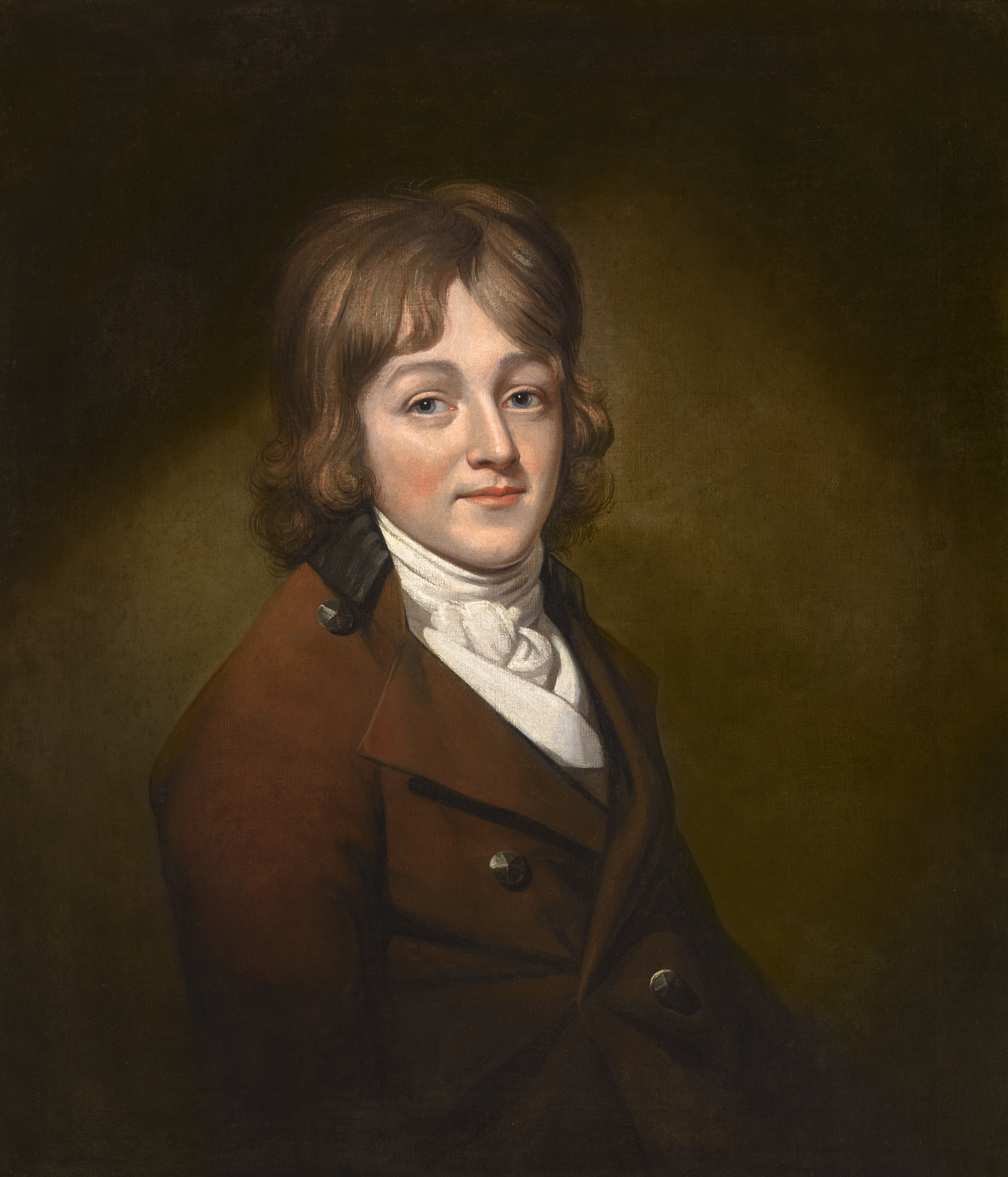
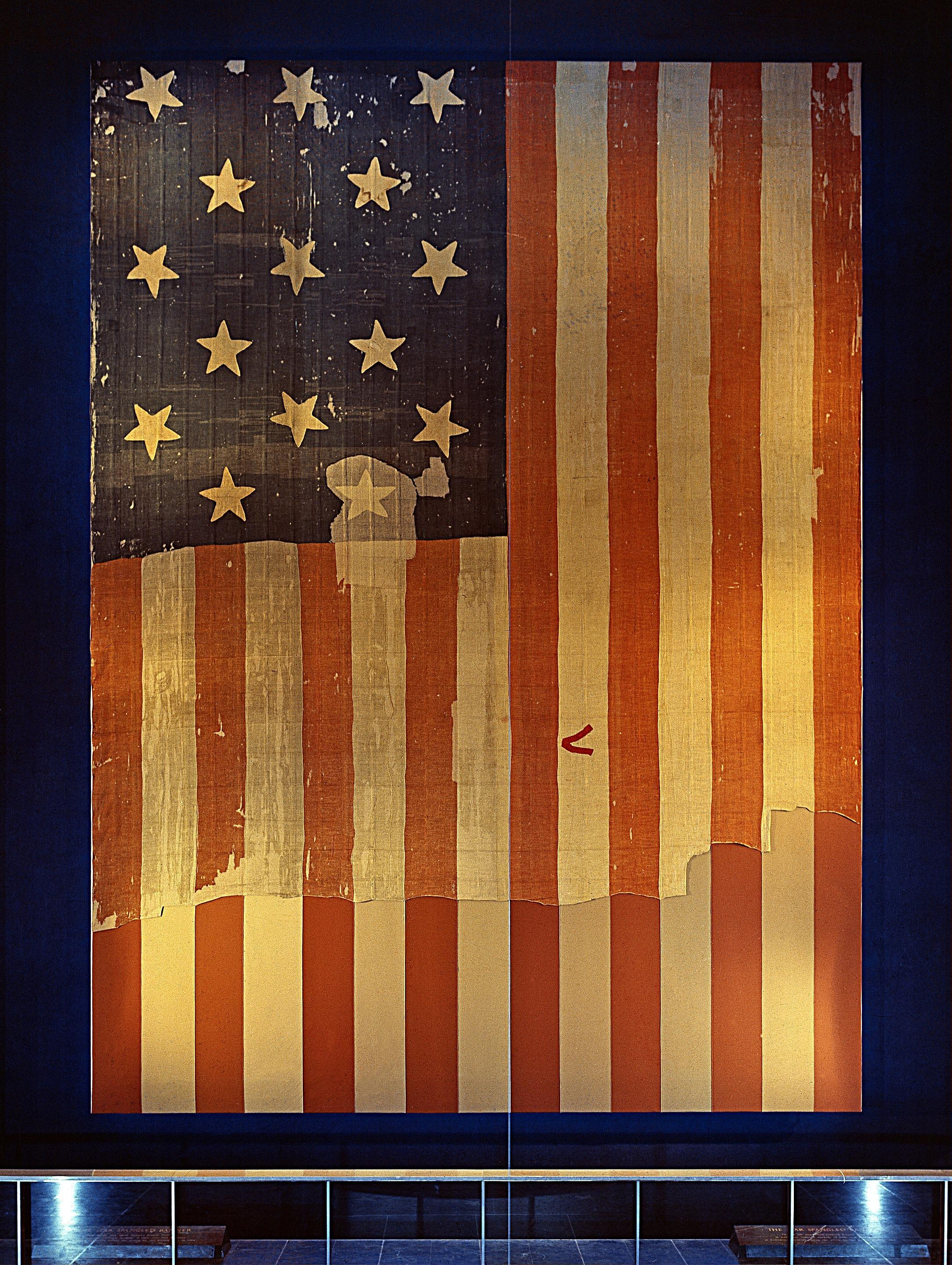
Francis Scott Key and the Star-Spangled Banner flag

In 1795, real estate developer and merchant Thomas Clarke built a brick house on Bridge Street, present-day M Street NW, in Georgetown, a separate municipality of Washington, D.C., at the time. The home was perched on a slope beside the Potomac River. It was three-and-a-half stories tall and it faced the river; the façade was two-and-a-half stories.

Francis Scott Key, a lawyer born in Frederick, Maryland, moved to Georgetown in 1805 with his wife, Mary Taylor Lloyd, when he began working for the firm of his wealthy uncle, Philip Barton Key I. In late 1805, the Keys moved into the house at 3518 Bridge Street. The couple raised their eleven children while living in the house. In addition to his legal work, Key participated in civil affairs and was heavily involved with St. John's Episcopal Church's activities.

==== War of 1812 ====
While living in the house, the War of 1812 brought destruction to the area when the British attacked the nation's capital, burning many landmarks, including the White House. While serving in the Georgetown Light Infantry in 1814, as the war continued, Key learned of a doctor, William Beanes, who had been arrested by British troops and taken to Baltimore. Key and an officer from Maryland left by boat on the Minden at the Georgetown port to travel to Baltimore in an attempt to secure the doctor's release. The two men arrived on September 7, 1814, and after several days of negotiations, were successful in retrieving Beanes. British forces would not let the men leave the city because the Battle of Baltimore was imminent and they didn't want American forces to learn of the plan.

While being detained on a British ship, the attack on Baltimore began on September 12. After Key watched Fort McHenry and its large American flag be bombarded, he wrote Defence of Fort McHenry, a poem about Britain's unsuccessful attack. Two days later, Key penned the remaining four stanzas in a Baltimore pub. The poem became incredibly popular and was made into a song, renamed The Star-Spangled Banner, which later became the national anthem of the United States. For his contribution of the poem, Key became a well-known figure in American history.

==== Key's life after the war ====
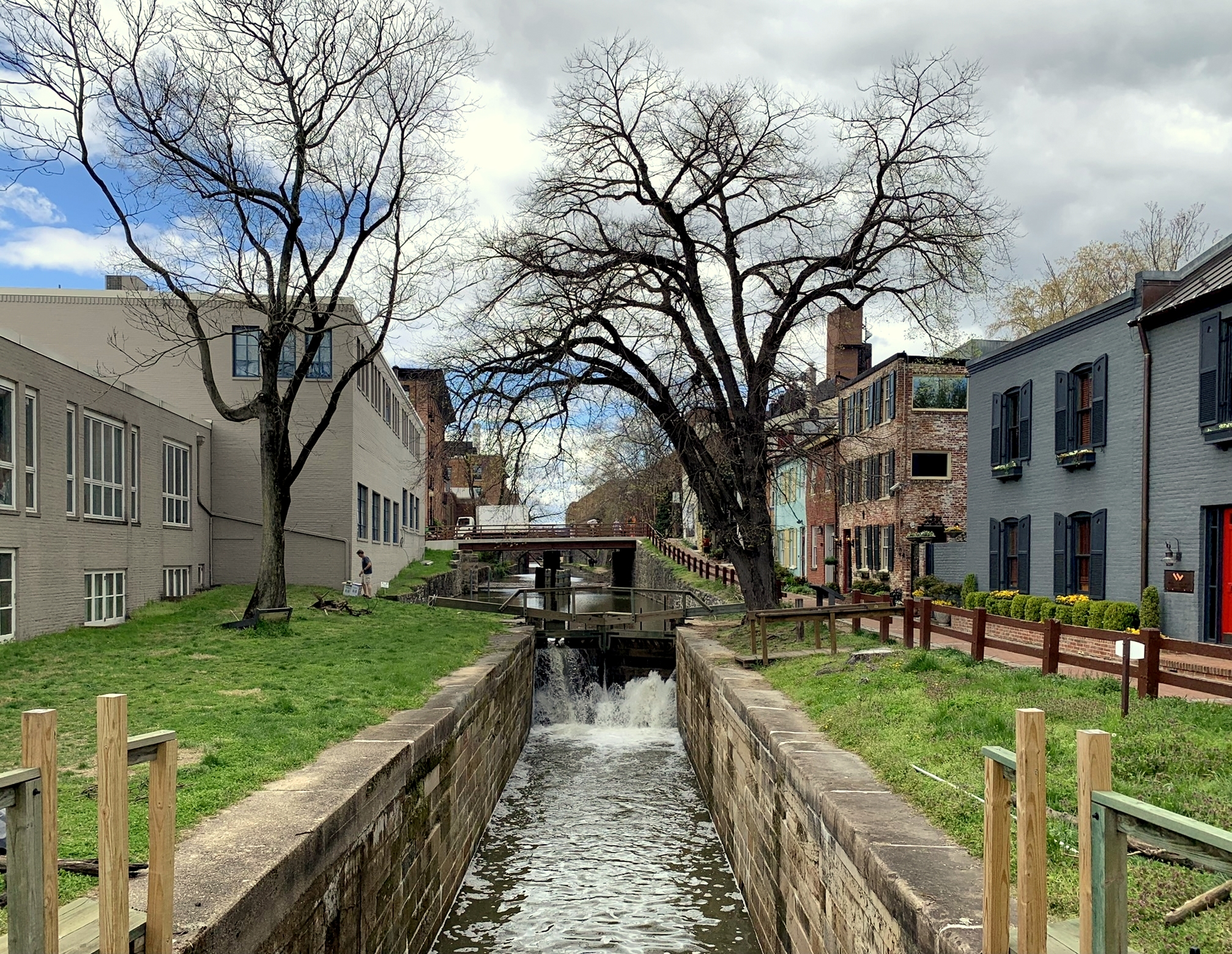
The Keys moved after the Chesapeake and Ohio Canal was built in 1830.

After the war concluded, Key continued to practice law. The Key family and the people they enslaved left Georgetown in 1830 when the Chesapeake and Ohio Canal (C&O Canal) and its boat traffic opened directly behind their house. They moved to Judiciary Square, so that Key could be closer to the court buildings, but he did keep an office in a wing of the Bridge Street house until 1843. From 1833 to 1840, he served as District Attorney for the City of Washington, where he repeatedly argued in defense of slavery and to restrict the abolitionist movement, even going so far as to restricting their free speech. In the case United States v. Reuben Crandall, Key was unsuccessful in his attempt to stop abolitionists from distributing literature. The result humiliated Key and he left public life during his remaining years.

==== Mid-to-late 19th-century ====
After the opening of the canal, the neighborhood around the house became an industrial area. In the years following Key's death in 1843, the house was owned by his heirs for ten years. It was sold and later became a hotel and restaurant during the Civil War, with a blacksmith shop located in the adjoining building. It's possible the owner during this time is the one who first modified the building's exterior, converting one of the windows to a second door.

During the next several decades, the Key House continued to be used for commercial purposes. It again served as a hotel starting in 1896, with The Washington Post writing the owner was "anxious to preserve the historical house", but also planned to add two stories to the house and a four-story adjoining building, and removal of the house's chimney. The hotel renovations never took place, and the house became a blacksmith shop and dry-goods store. "THE KEY MANSION" was painted in large black letters on the façade, in an attempt to draw in visitors who would shop at the store. Additional commercial properties were constructed on either side of the house, and the Georgetown Car Barn was built across the street, further changing the area from residential to commercial and industrial.

=== 20th-century ===
==== Preservation attempts ====
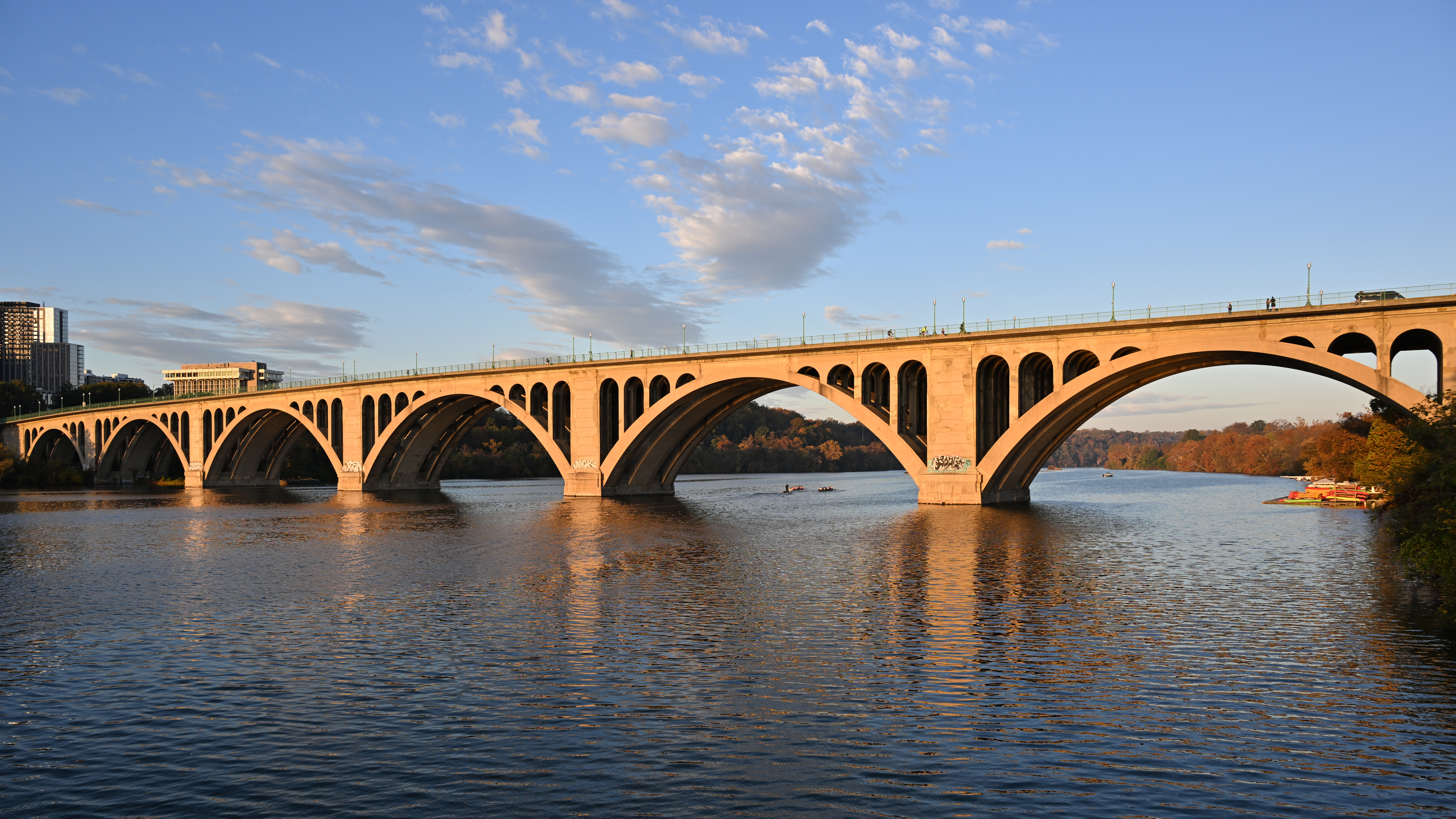
The Francis Scott Key Bridge was built in 1923 and is located near the Key House site.

In 1907, a group of preservationists formed the Francis Scott Key Memorial Association to restore and preserve the Key House. Members of the association included Admiral George Dewey, Rear Admiral Winfield Scott Schley, Judge Ashley Mulgrave Gould, local politician Henry Brown Floyd MacFarland, and Key's great-grandson, Francis Scott Key Smith. The association tried to recreate the successful saving of the Betsy Ross House in Philadelphia. The Key House was purchased by lawyer Hugh T. Taggart after Dewey convinced him to save the building, and the association decorated the exterior with U.S. flags and a portrait of Key. The house opened to the public after a dedication on February 23, 1908. A few months later on Flag Day, a memorial service was held at the house, which included speeches and a 21-gun salute.

Due to its location in an undesirable area and the lack of furniture or anything else related to Key, the museum saw few visitors. It only remained open for a few years before Taggart's death in 1912. His heirs drastically altered the appearance of the Key House, including removing the gable roof, removing the façade and installing glass-plate windows, demolishing the one-story adjoining building that Key used as office space and replacing it with a two-story commercial property, and removing the chimneys. These changes made some members of the public think the house had been demolished and replaced with another building.

During World War I, the Key House was turned into a factory that made U.S. flags. The Key Bridge opened near the house in 1923, resulting in further development of the surrounding area. In 1929, one of Key's granddaughters, Mary Lloyd Pendleton Abney, bequeathed to the National Gallery of Art (present-day Smithsonian American Art Museum) a collection of her grandfather's belongings. Among the donated items were some of Key's furnishings and family portraits.

The Key House in 1931 shows the drastic changes made to the building

In 1931, the National Park Service (NPS) purchased land and properties on the south side of M Street that were near the Key Bridge. The plan was to demolish the site's structures to create Palisades Park, but after locals argued to save the Key House, government officials assured citizens the house would remain and be restored. During the Great Depression, raising funds to restore the house did not meet the $25,000 goal (equivalent to $587,075 in 2025). Ulysses S. Grant III, who served as director of the Office of Public Buildings and Public Parks of the National Capital, led the unsuccessful fundraising effort.

Beginning in 1935, there were plans to dismantle the house and move the original building materials elsewhere. This idea was opposed by a collection of local officials and citizens, including Key's great-grandson, Francis Scott Key-Smith. There had been so many radical changes to the Key House that it was considered wasteful and unnecessary to save. Key-Smith said, "I do not believe, taking the proper definition of the word 'restore', the building can be restored." Key-Smith suggested demolishing the building and replacing it with a memorial fountain or obelisk. The NPS opposed this plan and insisted it would be capable of restoring the building. In April 1935, the NPS revealed their plan to restore it at a cost of $55,000.

The Key House remained unchanged through the following year, by which time all other buildings had been demolished. A NPS official, Stuart M. Barnette, said the house was too different from the original design to warrant the cost of restoration. He also stated: "Only two things...would justify the restoration of any ancient structure reduced to the present physical state of the Key House...historical significance and architectural importance" and "It is my opinion that neither the ruins are of great architectural importance, nor was the man great whose name is associated with the structure."

After the NPS purchased the C&O Canal in 1939, one plan for the Key House was to turn it into a recreation center and boating facility so that tourists could ride boats on the canal. The NPS shared this idea with members of the public, some of whom supported it, including the Progressive Citizens Association of Georgetown and the Georgetown Citizens Association.

==== Final years ====
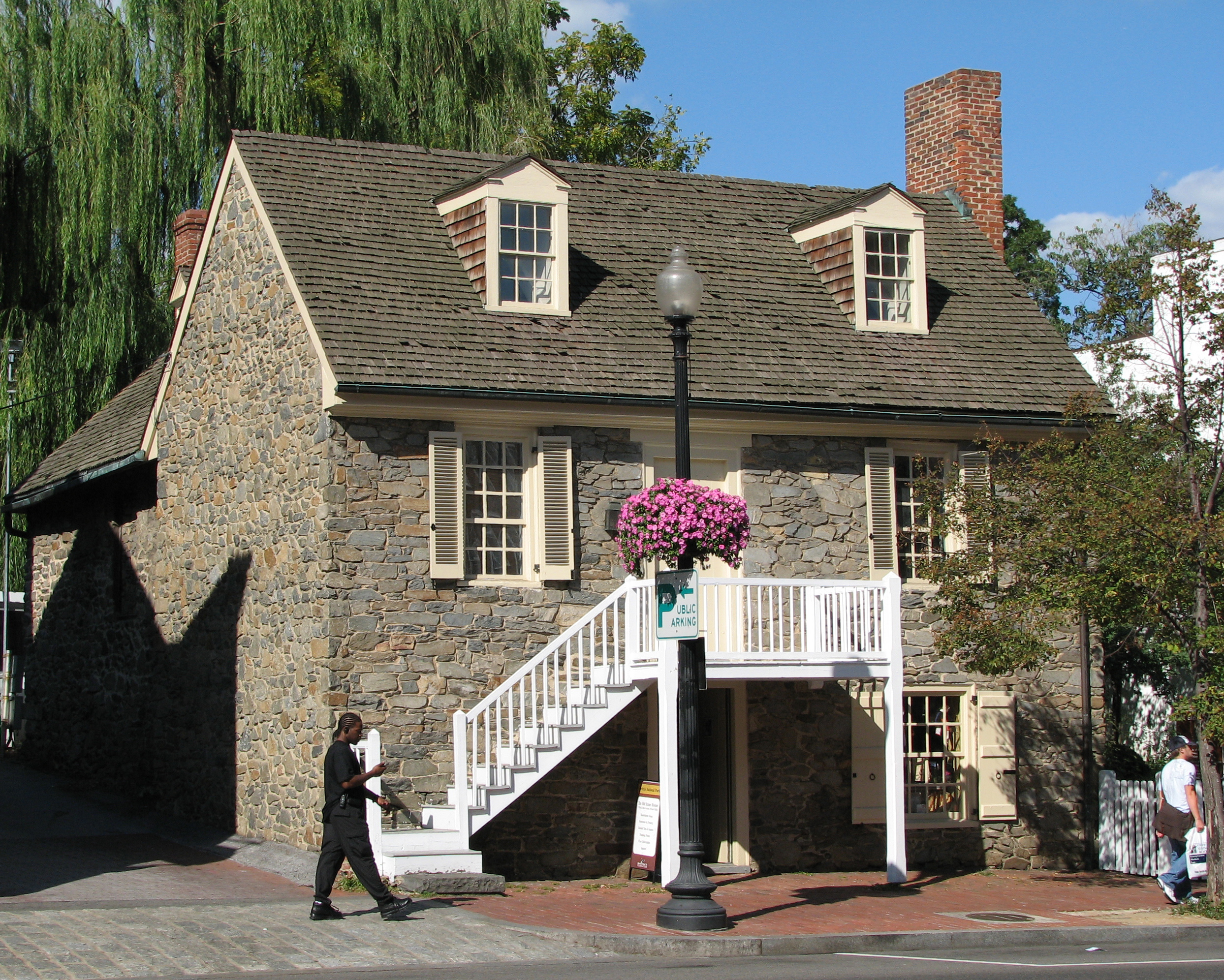
It is possible that some of the building material from the Key House was used when restoring the Old Stone House.

Ultimately, the National Capital Planning Commission (NCPC) approved city plans to build a ramp from the Whitehurst Freeway to the Key Bridge. The federal government wanted a quick way for drivers to exit the city during World War II and a faster way to reach The Pentagon, and the house stood in the way of doing that. Speaking on the idea of what to do with the house, Interior Secretary Harold L. Ickes said "In view of the importance of the proposed highway project and the fact that approximately 50% of the structure has been altered and is not original, it is recommended that the house be demolished and that an appropriate marker be placed on or near the site."

A few years later, local preservationists, including the Columbia Historical Society (CHS), fought to save the house from the wrecking ball. The group wanted the highway to be built slightly north, which would have resulted in the Georgetown Car Barn being demolished. The CHS also wanted its headquarters moved into the Key House, at a cost of $100,000. (equivalent to $2,298,100 in 2025) Members of the group who supported this idea included Associate Supreme Court Justice Harold H. Burton and prominent locals. The plan was rejected, and as a compromise, the CHS asked for the Key House to be moved to an empty lot on the east side of the bridge. A second plan was to move the Key House to a strip of land at 37th and Canal Streets NW.

In 1948, Congress approved $65,000 (equivalent to $871,018 in 2025) in funding to have the house dismantled and moved to a new location, but this was vetoed by President Harry S. Truman after the Bureau of the Budget announced it would be too costly to rebuild and maintain a replica. Before Truman vetoed the funding, work by the Alexander and Repass construction firm had already started on the site, with materials numbered and moved to a storage area underneath the Arlington Memorial Bridge. The building parts and brick foundation were left at the new location, and without funding approved for further work to be done, the materials remained untouched. It's unclear who moved or picked up the dismantled pieces, but over time, the pile grew smaller until there was nothing left. NPS historian Barry Mackintosh said, "After the reconstruction prospects died, so did much incentive for the Park Service to zealously guard the brick pile." It's believed some of the parts were used when restoring the nearby Old Stone House, and Quality Hill allegedly incorporates the Key House doorway. A planned memorial plaque or flagpole was to be installed by the NPS at the original site, but this did not occur.

==== Memorial park ====
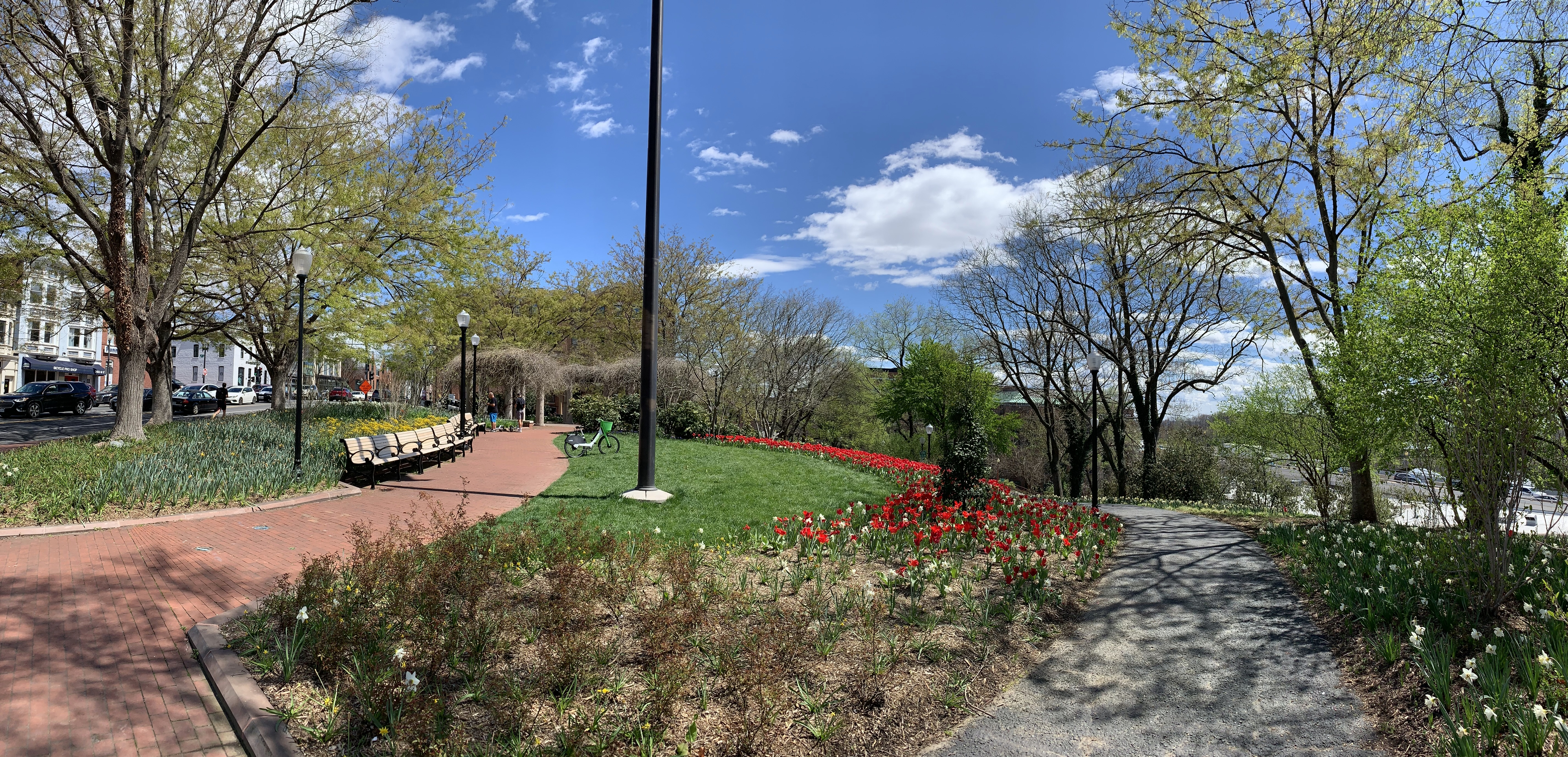
Francis Scott Key Memorial Park

During the 1980s, a group of Georgetown Citizens formed the Francis Scott Key Park Foundation Inc. Its goal was to create a memorial park behind the Key House site because it would be a "fitting place to honor Key and provide an impressive gateway to the District." In 1986, Congress authorized that the memorial should be built by the group. During the next few years, over $500,000 was raised, but the group needed an additional $800,000 in 1990 to complete the project. The plan was to overhaul the site's landscaping, which included planting 12,000 lilies, in addition to new irrigation, lighting, and a pergola.

After raising $1.5 million for construction and a bronze bust of Key, the Francis Scott Key Memorial was officially opened on September 14, 1993, the 179th anniversary of when The Star-Spangled Banner was written. Hundreds of people attended the dedication, which began at St. John's Episcopal Church, and ended at the memorial park. The event was attended by Dionne Warwick, E. G. Marshall, Sandi Patti, and Mayor Sharon Pratt. A flag with fifteen stars and stripes, the same number as the Star-Spangled flag, was raised at the site.

== Design ==
Layout of the basement level

The Key House was a brick colonial; it was two-and-a-half stories tall facing the street, and three-and-a-half stories in the back. The back of the house, which included a framed porch, faced a descending hill that included a garden where Key grew plants that were in the shape of his children's names. A one-story addition used for office space was located on the west side of the house. When it was built, there were still large trees on the property. The house had a gabled roof and two large brick chimneys. In addition to the main house, there was an outhouse, smokehouse, and coach house.

The house was three bays wide and featured dormer windows. One of the windows on the first floor was later renovated into a second entrance. The exterior walls of the house were said to be 2 ft (0.61 m) thick while interior walls were 18 in (46 cm) thick. The chimneys were so large that one could allegedly build a new house with all of the bricks used in the two chimneys.

The original floor plan included a door on the left side of the house. Once inside, there was a long hallway leading from the entrance. On the first floor were two parlors to the right of the hallway, and a sun porch facing the Potomac River. The basement level, which also faced the river, is where the kitchen, dining room, and cold room were located. There was another long hallway on the second floor that led to two bedrooms. There were four bedrooms on the third floor.
