= Francis Scott Key Memorial =

Park and memorial in Washington, D.C., U.S.

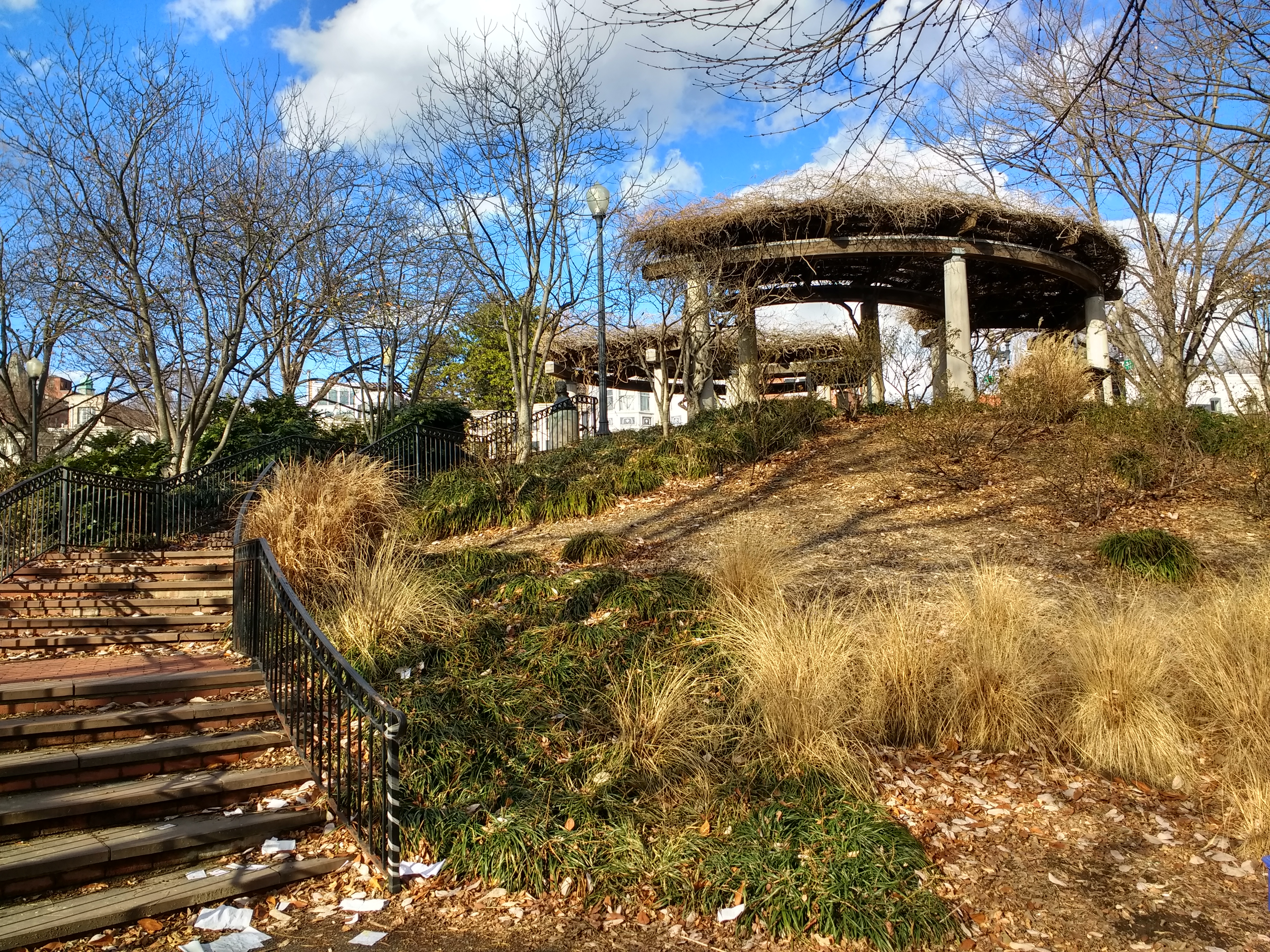
- Francis Scott Key Park

- Location within District of Columbia
- Location: 34th and M Street, NW Washington, D.C.
- Coordinates: 38°54′17.3″N 77°04′05.3″W
- Area: 0.77 acres (0.31 ha)
- Created: 1993
- Operator: National Park Service, Rock Creek Park

Francis Scott Key Memorial is a park and memorial located in the Georgetown neighborhood of Washington, D.C., at the intersection of 34th and M Streets, NW. Established in 1993, this 0.77 acre (3,104 m²) site is administered by the National Park Service as a part of Rock Creek Park, but is not contiguous with that park. Situated adjacent to the northeast corner of the Francis Scott Key Bridge, the park abuts to Chesapeake and Ohio Canal Towpath.

== History ==
At the time of the establishment of Washington, D.C., Francis Scott Key Park was located within the existing municipality of Georgetown in Montgomery County, Maryland. The land was acquired by the National Capital Park Commission pursuant to the Capper-Crampton Act of May 29, 1930. The park was dedicated to Francis Scott Key, author of "The Star-Spangled Banner", and donated by the Francis Scott Key Foundation to the National Park Service in 1993.

== Landmarks and features ==
At the center of the park is a brownstone brick plaza covered by a limestone pergola draped in wisteria. The centerpiece is a bronze bust of Francis Scott Key by sculptor Betty Mailhouse Dunston. To the sides are interpretative signs. Within the park flies a 15-star, 15-stripe replica of the flag that flew over Fort McHenry when Key wrote "The Star-Spangled Banner".
