= Statue of Francis Scott Key (San Francisco) =

Statue by William W. Story in San Francisco, California, U.S.

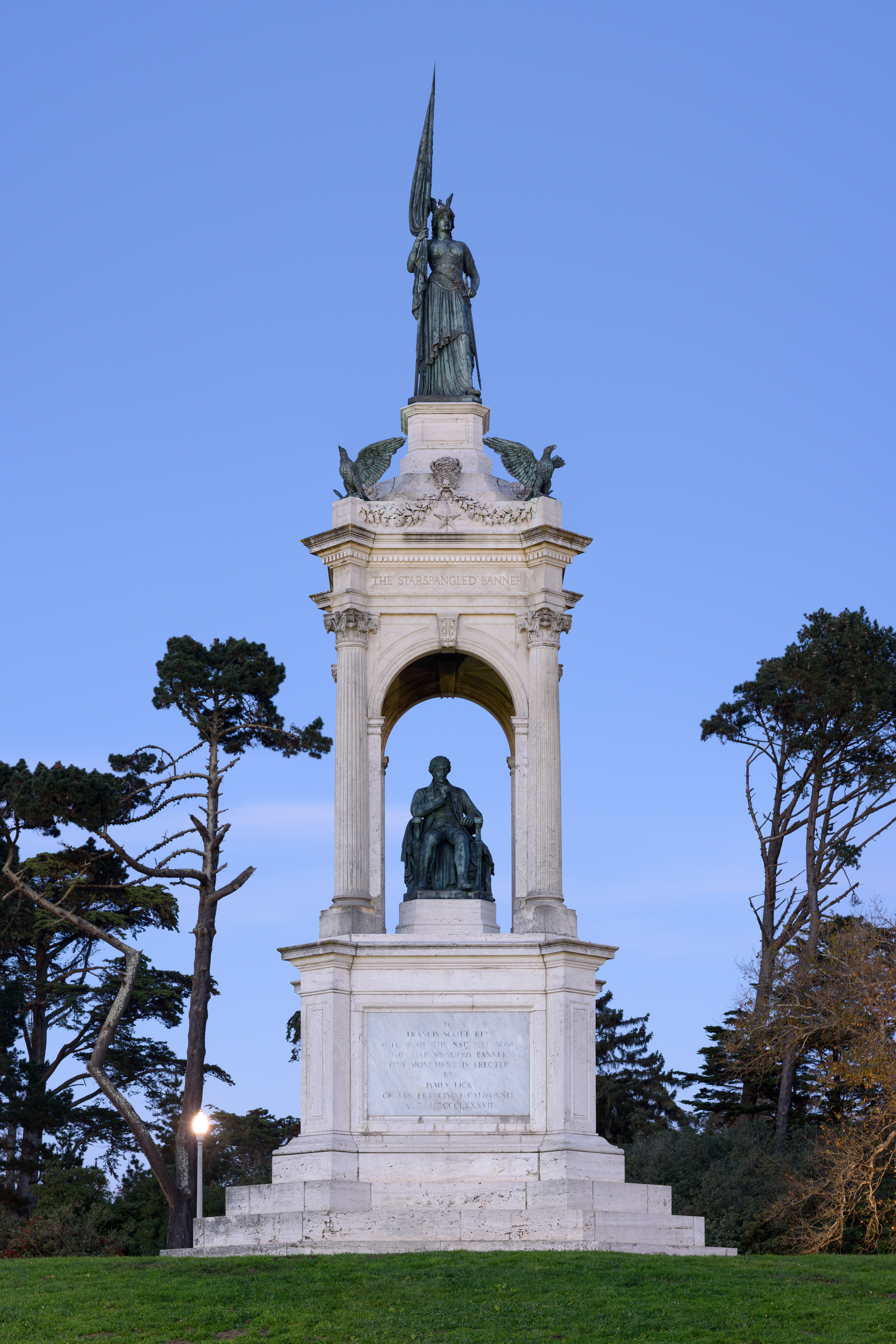
- The monument in 2016
- Year: 1888
- Subject: Francis Scott Key
- Location: San Francisco, California, U.S.; 37.77126°N 122.46664°W

A memorial statue of Francis Scott Key stood in Golden Gate Park, San Francisco, in the U.S. state of California, from 1888 until 2020.

== Original monument ==
The monument to Francis Scott Key was commissioned by San Francisco businessman James Lick, who donated some $60,000 for a sculpture of Key to be raised in San Francisco's Golden Gate Park. The nation's first memorial to Key, it consisted of a sculpture of the seated Key, within a travertine monument displaying text from "The Star-Spangled Banner", and surmounted by a statue of Columbia and four eagles. It was executed by sculptor William W. Story in Rome during 1885–1887, transported to San Francisco, and unveiled on July 4, 1888, near a new music stand.

In the San Francisco earthquake of 1906, the monument was damaged and, when repaired, it was re-erected in a more prominent position in the park, on the south side of the Music Concourse. In 1967 it was dismantled and taken into storage to allow further expansion of the nearby California Academy of Sciences. When restored to public view, on July 4, 1977, it was placed in yet another location, at the eastern end of the Music Concourse. In the 2010s, the city of San Francisco completed a $140,000 renovation of the Key monument.

== Removal and Monumental Reckoning ==
The statue was toppled by vandals on June 19, 2020, in the wake of the murder of George Floyd. A year later, on Juneteenth 2021, sculptor Dana King unveiled Monumental Reckoning, comprising 350 sculptures encircling the plinth of the empty monument. These 4 feet (1.2 meters) high sculptures represented the first Africans kidnapped from their homeland in Angola and sold into chattel slavery in Virginia in 1619. The words "Lift Every Voice" were also installed above the Spreckels Temple of Music in honor of the civil rights activist James Weldon Johnson, author of "Lift Every Voice and Sing", a hymn often referred to as the "Black national anthem". The sculptures stood until early 2024.
