= Day & Date =

American syndicated television program

- Presented by: Dana King; Patrick Vanhorn
- Country of origin: United States
- Original language: English
- No. of seasons: 2

Production
- Executive producers: Erik Sorenson; John Tomlin; Bob Young
- Camera setup: Multi-camera
- Running time: 60 minutes
- Production companies: Group W Productions (1995-1996) (season 1); Eyemark Entertainment (1996-1997) (seasons 1-2)

Original release
- Network: Syndication
- Release: September 11, 1995 – January 3, 1997

Day & Date is an American daily news magazine program that aired in syndication for two seasons from September 11, 1995, to January 3, 1997. Syndicated by Group W Productions (later renamed Eyemark Entertainment following the 1996 merger of Group W and CBS), it was hosted by Dana King and Patrick Vanhorn. The program was intended as a lead-in to local early news programs.

== Background ==
The series debuted on September 11, 1995, for the start of the 1995 television season. It was picked up by a variety of stations, some of which had just switched to CBS following deals that had taken effect earlier in 1995 (or, in some cases, the day before) resulting from the 1994–1996 United States broadcast television realignment. Segments combined news, talk, and entertainment issues. Toward the end of its run, Gordon Elliott joined as an occasional correspondent.

Its second season premiered on September 9, 1996, on 87 stations serving 74 percent of the country. Despite low ratings, it was the only freshman first-run strip syndicated program renewed for the 1996–1997 television season. A new format was instituted, focusing on features and less on news headlines. but low ratings (a 1.6 for the second season) spurred Eyemark to cancel Day & Date effective January 3, 1997. Mid-afternoon local newscasts which launched in the 4 p.m. hour throughout the mid-1990s had also made the program superfluous with the growth of syndicated and wire service segments featuring the same type of content in the same timeslots Day and Date were in, with much less expense using local staff and more finessing to a local market's tastes than that of a nationally syndicated program.
