= Dana King =

American journalist and sculptor (born 1960)

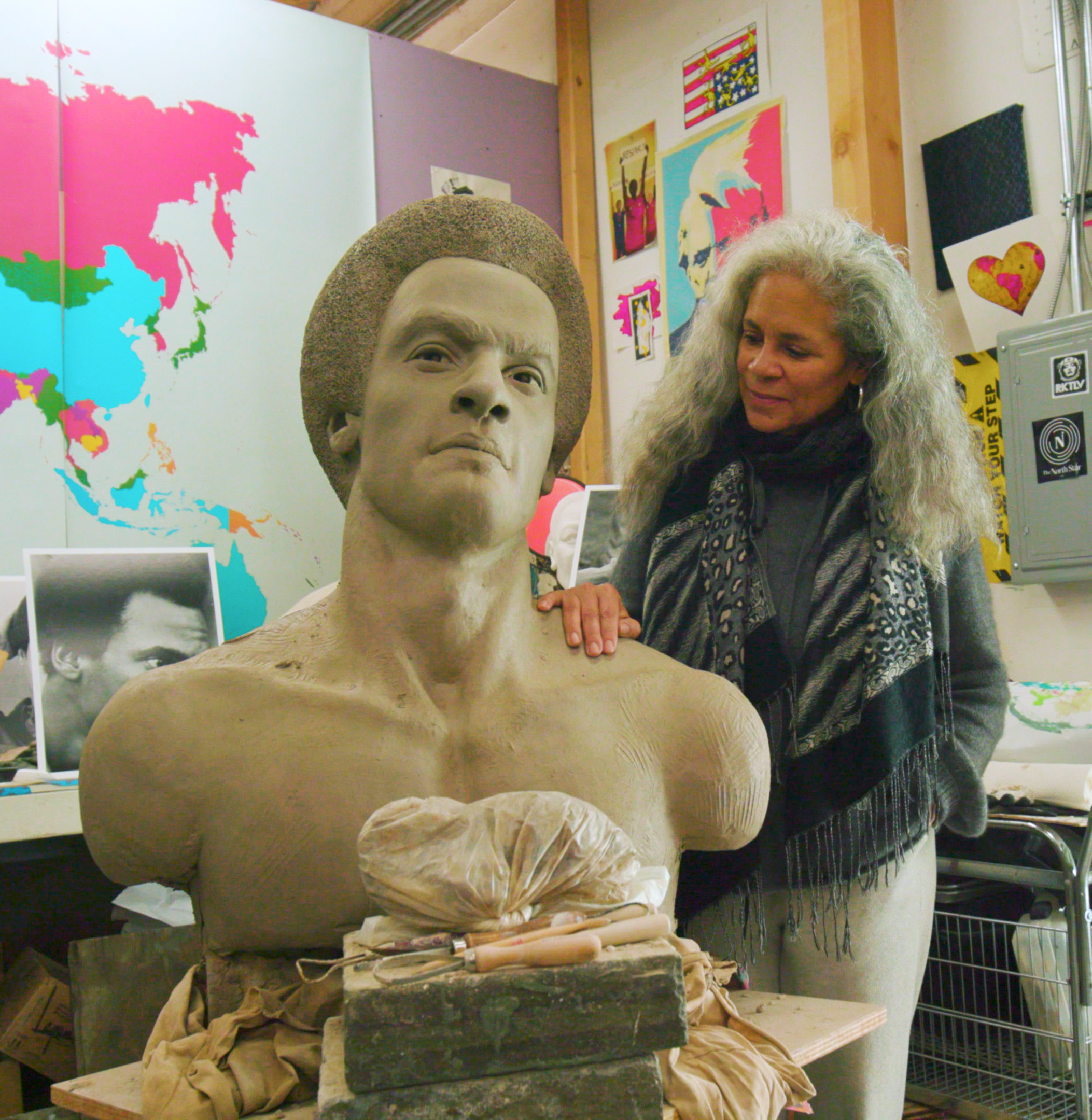
- King with in-progress Huey Newton Monument, 2021
- Born: March 7, 1960 (age 66); Cleveland, Ohio, U.S.
- Education: Ferris State University; Academy of Art University
- Occupations: Journalist, TV Anchor; Sculptor
- Notable credit(s): Good Morning America; CBS Morning News; National Memorial for Peace and Justice
- Website: danakingart.com

Dana King (born March 7, 1960) is an American broadcast journalist and sculptor. She served as an anchor for the CBS owned-and-operated station KPIX-TV in San Francisco. In 2012, King left KPIX to pursue her passion in sculpting and art. Her outdoor sculpture commemorating the Montgomery bus boycott is displayed at the National Memorial for Peace and Justice in Montgomery, Alabama. Through research for her work, King finds "historically generalized and racist ideologies that demand a wholesale upheaval of the normative misrepresentation of Black peoples’ emotional and physical sacrifices"

== Journalism career ==
King won her second of five local Emmy Awards for her reporting in Honduras in 1998 and 2000, reporting on the consequences of Hurricane Mitch. King also won an RTNDA Edward R. Murrow Award in March 2005 for her reporting on the tenth anniversary of the Rwandan genocide. She won another Murrow Award in 2009 for a series called "Assignment Africa." She is also known for her coverage of the conflict in Afghanistan, and the September 11 Attacks.

In 1993, King co-anchored the debut of ABC's Good Morning America Sunday, before moving to CBS's CBS Morning News (1994–95) and other CBS News programs, including the short-lived syndicated newsmagazine Day and Date.

== Art career ==
King announced her departure as a news anchor for CBS San Francisco on December 7, 2012. Although this departure allowed King more free time to pursue her art career, she initially began her career while simultaneously working as a news anchor for KPIX-TV (CBS 5). In the time following her departure, King planned to pursue her passion for art and sculpting. King regarded sculpting to be her "third career," explaining art and sculpture to be her passion and true calling. King's art includes the mediums of sculpture, charcoal drawing, and oil painting. Furthermore, King explains her departure from journalism, saying, "I'm still a journalist, but now my medium is clay."

Throughout her art career, King is known for her sculptures and community projects that revolve around the goal of portraying a political message. One of King's best known sculptures is her outdoor sculpture dedicated to the memory of the women who led and sustained the Montgomery bus boycott. This sculpture is on display at the National Memorial for Peace and Justice that opened in 2018 in Montgomery, Alabama. This sculpture depicts a teacher, grandma, and pregnant woman who are standing in a triangular formation. Furthermore, King utilized her knowledge gained through journalism to portray these women as if they were from 1950s Alabama. This sculpture of women, according to King, was meant to portray how the women involved were "quiet activists" who were silently making a difference although faced with discrimination. She was recognized as one of "10 Emerging Black Female Artists To Collect" by Black Art in America. King is also an entrepreneur and the owner of a thriving artists’ enclave located in Oakland, California.

King prefers sculptures because they inhabit space and according to her space is power. She believes sculpture provides an opportunity to shape culturally significant memories that determine how African descendants are publicly regarded and remembered. She believes that the African descendants deserve public monuments of truth that radiate their powerful, resilient, and undying endurance created from a Black aesthetic point of view.

On October 13, 2018, in Oakland, California, members of the Oakland community began the painting of a mural near a local homeless encampment with the theme "Oakland for all of us." This mural project was made possible by King who donated the space from the building she owns at East 12th Street and 13th Avenue. King donated the wall with the hope to bring the community together as well as bring awareness to political change. King explained, "Oakland is in the midst of an economic renaissance, but so many are being left behind."

In 2016, King created a sculpture, entitled A Man for the People, dedicated to William Byron Rumford, the first African American member of the California State Assembly elected from Northern California, in 1948. The art piece was the first in Berkeley, California, to honor an African American.

A year after the statue of Francis Scott Key in San Francisco's Golden Gate Park was toppled by protesters on June 19, 2020 in the wake of the murder of George Floyd, King unveiled Monumental Reckoning, which now encircles the plinth of the empty monument. These 350 sculptures, each four feet (1.2 meters), represent the first Africans kidnapped from their homeland in Angola and sold into chattel slavery in Virginia in 1619.

Recent work includes a statue of pioneering Negro League baseball player Toni Stone, a bust of Joseph Gier, the first Black tenured professor in the University of California system, a bust of journalist and civil right activist Ida B. Wells, and a statue of civil rights activist Ella Baker. King relocated from California to Vero Beach, Florida in 2022 to join her daughter and grandchild.

== Works ==
- Chrysalis
- A Man for the People, Berkeley, California, a sculpture of Byron Rumford
- Archangel of the Forest, Thelma Harris Art Gallery, Oakland
- Waiting on the Wind, Thelma Harris Art Gallery, Oakland
- Monumental Reckoning, Golden Gate Park, San Francisco
