= Key Bridge (Washington, D.C.) =

Bridge in Washington, D.C., and Virginia, U.S.

- Coordinates: 38°54′08″N 77°04′11″W

Characteristics
- Clearance below: 60 ft (18 m)
- Key Bridge
- U.S. National Register of Historic Places
- D.C. Inventory of Historic Sites
- Virginia Landmarks Register
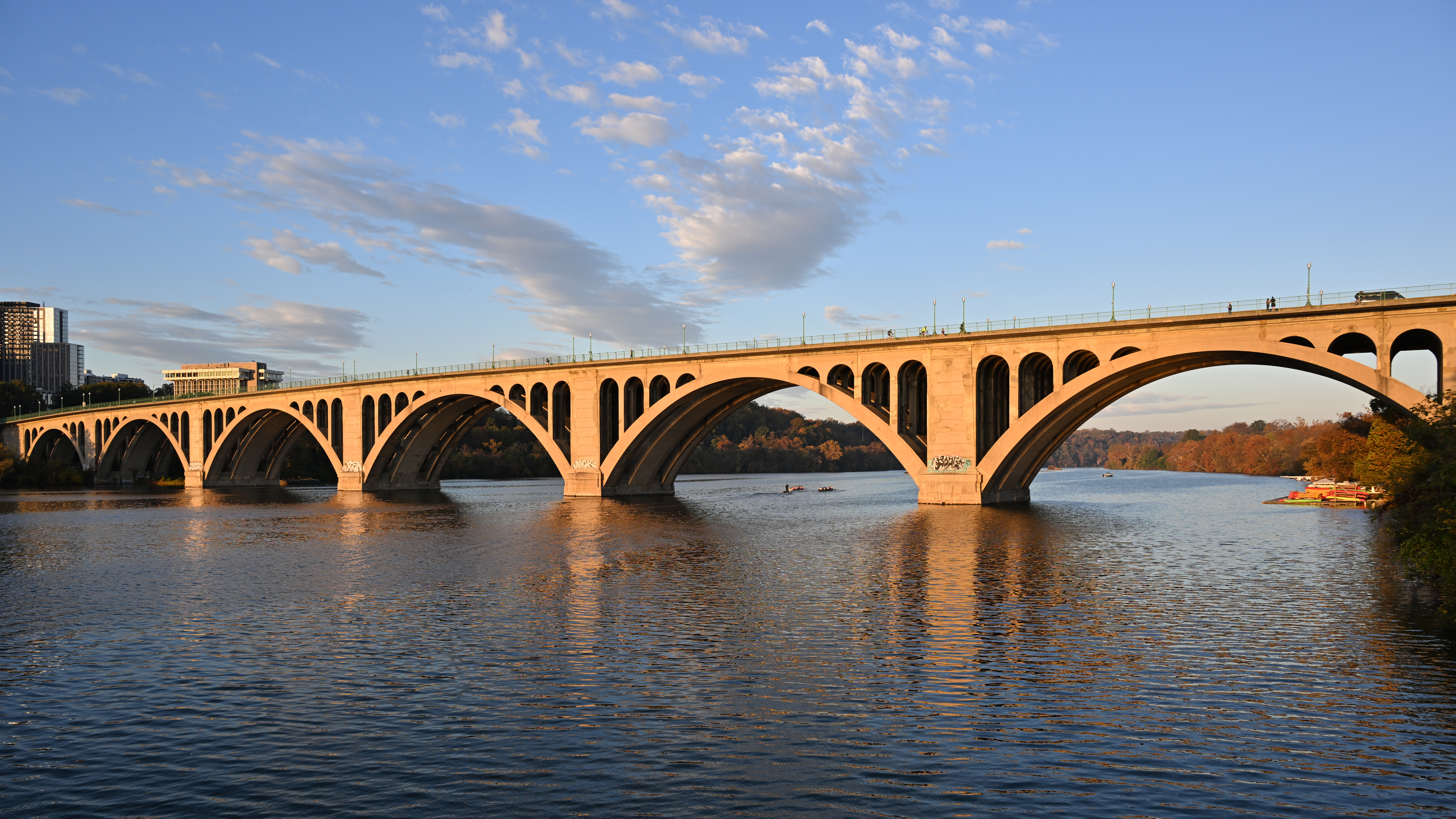

- Location within Washington, D.C.
- Location: US 29 over the Potomac River between Rosslyn, Virginia, and Georgetown, Washington, D.C.
- Coordinates: 38°54′8.5″N 77°4′11.6″W
- Built: 1923
- Architects: Nathan C. Wyeth; Max C. Tyler
- Architectural style: Classical Revival arch bridge 1,701 ft (518.5 m) long
- NRHP reference No.: 96000199
- VLR No.: DC Local

Significant dates
- Added to NRHP: March 1, 1996
- Designated DCIHS: November 8, 1964
- Designated VLR: October 18, 1995

Location
- Interactive map of Key Bridge

The Francis Scott Key Bridge, more commonly known as the Key Bridge, is a six-lane reinforced concrete arch bridge carrying U.S. Route 29 (US 29) across the Potomac River between the Rosslyn neighborhood of Arlington County, Virginia, and the Georgetown neighborhood of Washington, D.C. Completed in 1923, it is Washington's oldest surviving road bridge across the Potomac River.

Key Bridge was named for the poet Francis Scott Key, who wrote the words of the American national anthem "The Star-Spangled Banner". It was added to the National Register of Historic Places in 1996.

== History ==
=== Deterioration of the Aqueduct Bridge ===
The Key Bridge replaced the Aqueduct Bridge, built in 1830 to carry the Chesapeake and Ohio Canal across the Potomac to connect with the Alexandria Canal on the Virginia shore. The bridge was converted into a roadway during the American Civil War. In 1866, the canal was restored and a new wooden roadway built over it atop trestles. The bridge was demolished down to its stone piers in 1884.

A second Aqueduct bridge, erected on the old piers, opened in 1889. Within a dozen years, proposals were being made to replace it. These proposals were delayed after the 1902 release of the McMillan Plan, whose proposals for new Potomac bridges called into question whether Aqueduct Bridge should be replaced or merely torn down. In the meantime, Congress approved repairs to the bridge in 1902, 1908, and 1913. In 1906, a cantilevered structure was added, allowing streetcars to begin operating over the bridge.

=== The Carlin bill ===
In March 1914, Representative Charles Creighton Carlin of Virginia sponsored legislation to replace Aqueduct Bridge with a new, $1 million structure. The Commissioners of the District of Columbia (the city's appointed government) approved the new bridge in June. Controversy over the new bridge immediately broke out. Senator Claude A. Swanson, chairman of the Senate Committee on Public Works, wanted the new bridge built about 3,000 feet (910 m) downstream at the mouth of Rock Creek (at about 30th Street NW), where it would cross Analostan Island and the Potomac River to Rosslyn. Georgetown merchants strongly opposed this plan. Some in Congress wanted to repair the existing bridge, but a study by the United States Army Corps of Engineers in August 1914 showed that the existing structure was inadequate for the amount of traffic and too unstable to be saved. Secretary of War Lindley Miller Garrison, who oversaw the Corps, agreed that a new bridge was necessary in December. Rep. William C. Adamson, chairman of the House Committee on Public Works, challenged Swanson and declared that the new bridge should be placed where the old one was.

The Carlin bill began moving through the House in January 1915. But House members balked at the cost. Garrison tried to break the deadlock on January 9 by issuing a report that declared the existing bridge unsafe, and requesting that the new one be built in the same location. The D.C. Commissioners said the location of the bridge was up to them, and the Corps warned that not only could the existing bridge not be enlarged but agreed with Garrison that it was structurally unsound. Swanson changed his mind, and agreed in January 1916 that the new bridge should be built on the existing site. Garrison endorsed the Carlin bill on January 27. On February 3, 1916, vehicular traffic over Aqueduct Bridge was limited by the city to a single automobile at a time due to its dangerous nature. The House passed legislation appropriating $1.175 million for construction of a new bridge on March 6. D.C. commissioners held hearings on the bridge site in late March, and approved the site in early April. The Senate passed some minor amendments to the House bill, and after some legislative discussions and a conference committee, the Carlin bill passed Congress on May 2, 1916. President Woodrow Wilson signed the legislation on May 19.

=== Construction ===
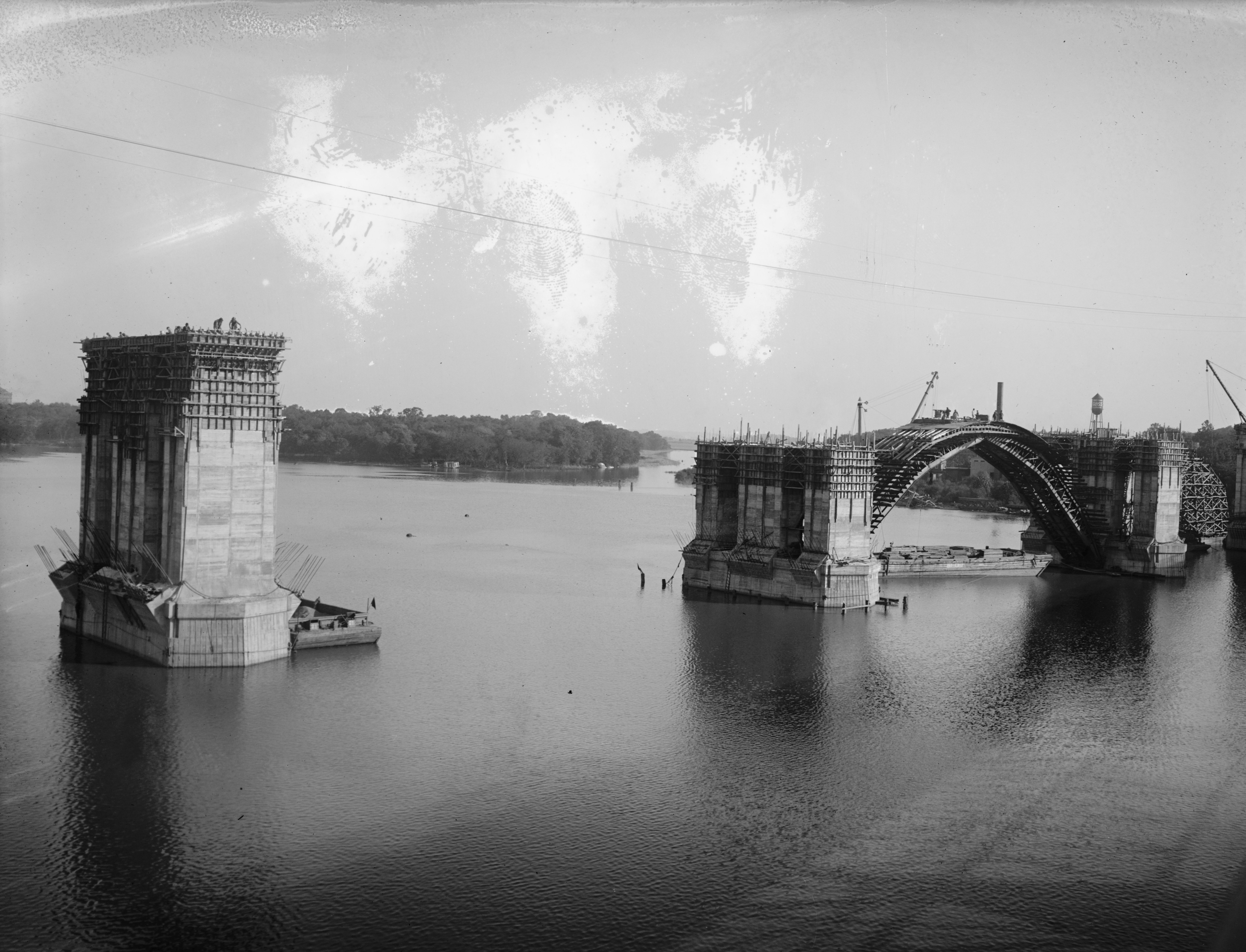
Key Bridge under construction, c. 1920

On June 1, 1916, the Army Corps of Engineers named the new bridge "Francis Scott Key Bridge," in honor of Francis Scott Key, who had written the lyrics to the "Star Spangled Banner" and whose home was just a few blocks from the bridge's abutment. Plans began to be drawn up at that time.

The Classical Revival bridge was designed by Nathan C. Wyeth, an architect in private practice in the city, and Major Max C. Tyler, an engineer with the Army Corps of Engineers. The legislation authorizing the bridge's construction required that the United States Department of War consult with the United States Commission of Fine Arts (CFA) in the design of the bridge. Subsequently, the Chief of Engineers of the Army Corps of Engineers asked the CFA for a list of architects whom the CFA believed would be competent to design an aesthetically pleasing bridge. The CFA swiftly provided a list, and in July 1916 Tyler met with the CFA to discuss a short list of potential architects. The CFA and Tyler also conferred on the bridge's orientation, design, and approaches. Tyler selected Wyeth. The plans were nearly complete by September. Wyeth and Tyler's initial design for the bridge was a double-deck structure with a single, high span. But with World War I erupting in Europe, inflation made this structure too costly. Wyeth then submitted a design for a single-deck, single-span bridge on January 12, 1917. The CFA asked Wyeth to design a multi-span bridge, or, failing that, to construct non-structural decorative elements that would make it look as if the bridge had multiple spans. Wyeth agreed, and the CFA approved the bridge design.

In January 1917, the Corps of Engineers found that inflation in the price of construction materials made it necessary to ask for $300,000 more in funding from Congress. Congress balked at paying. But citizen pressure and the danger of Aqueduct Bridge's collapse due to ice flows in the spring convinced Congress to pay the money.

Construction contracts were drawn up in late February, and excavation work on the D.C. abutments began in March. The first coffer dam for construction of the piers was sunk in May 1918, and the old Aqueduct Bridge formally closed on July 9. Immense amounts of concrete were needed to construct the bridge. One concrete mixing plant was constructed on the D.C. shore, and concrete was delivered to the worksite in the river by ropeway conveyor. A second mixing plant was constructed in mid-river: The plant was floated into position, and then allowed to sink down to the riverbed. Steel for the reinforced concrete structure and for the steel arches within its spans was assembled on the D.C. shoreline, then floated by barge to the worksite. Progress was slow, as reinforced concrete was a relatively new type of construction. The project ran out of money, and Tyler requested and won an additional $1.1 million from Congress in 1920 to finish the work. Streetcar tracks were laid down the center of the bridge.

The new $2.35 million Key Bridge opened on January 17, 1923, whereupon the old Aqueduct Bridge was finally closed. The federal government turned title to the new bridge over to the District of Columbia on November 15, 1924. The Washington and Old Dominion Railway, which had operated streetcars across the Aqueduct Bridge, declined to operate on the new bridge. It ended service into the District of Columbia with the closure of the old bridge and built a new terminal in Rosslyn. Service from this terminal, across Key Bridge, and into D.C. was provided by the Capital Traction Company.

The razing of the old Aqueduct Bridge began in December 1933, when its superstructure and most of the above-water portions of its piers were removed. The bases of the piers were retained to protect the Key Bridge from ice floes, but only one survives today. Its Washington and Virginia abutments survive just west of Key Bridge.

== Description ==
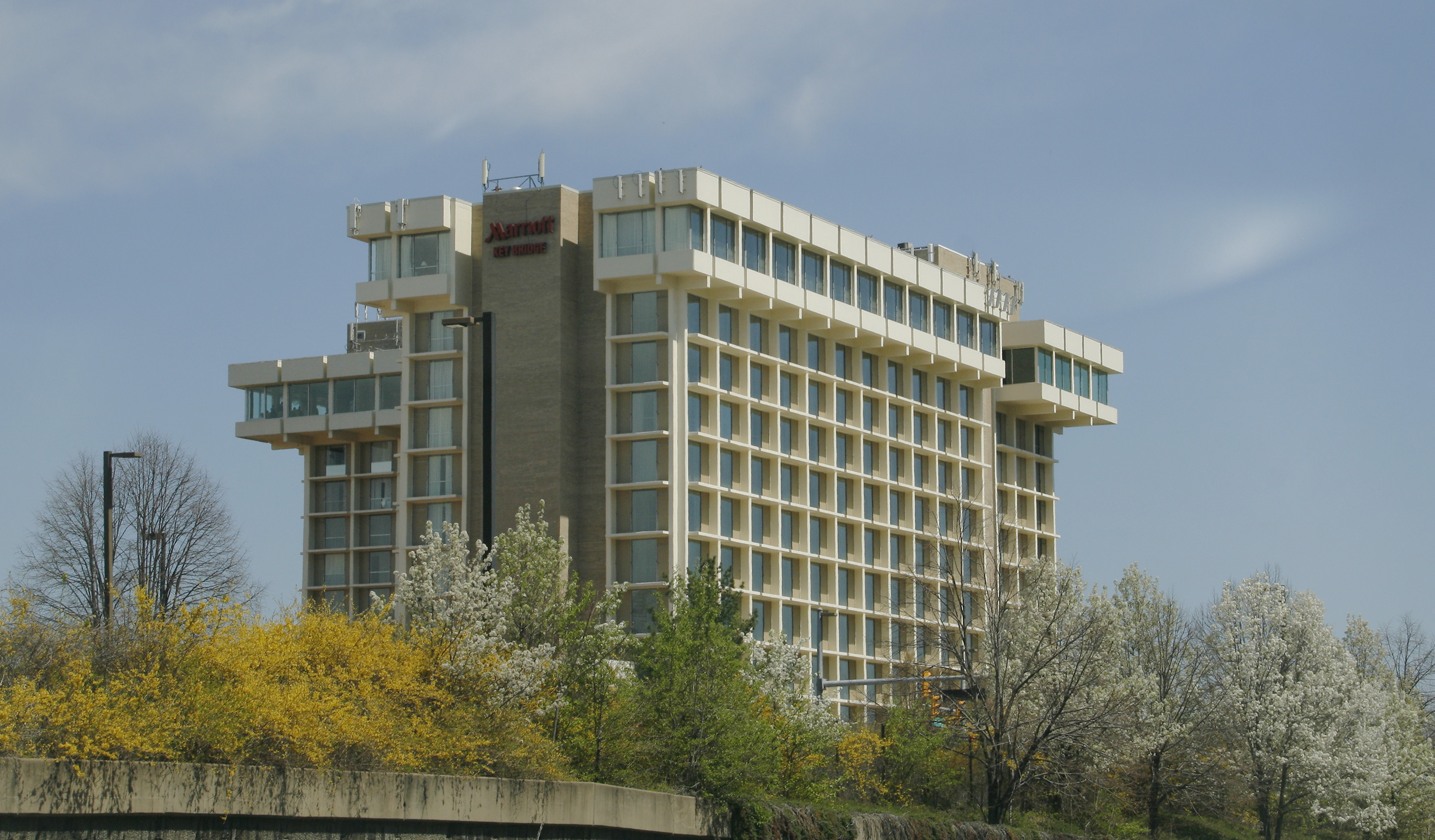
The former Key Bridge Marriott in Rosslyn (pictured here in 2009) was the company's oldest hotel, and a minor location in the Watergate scandal.

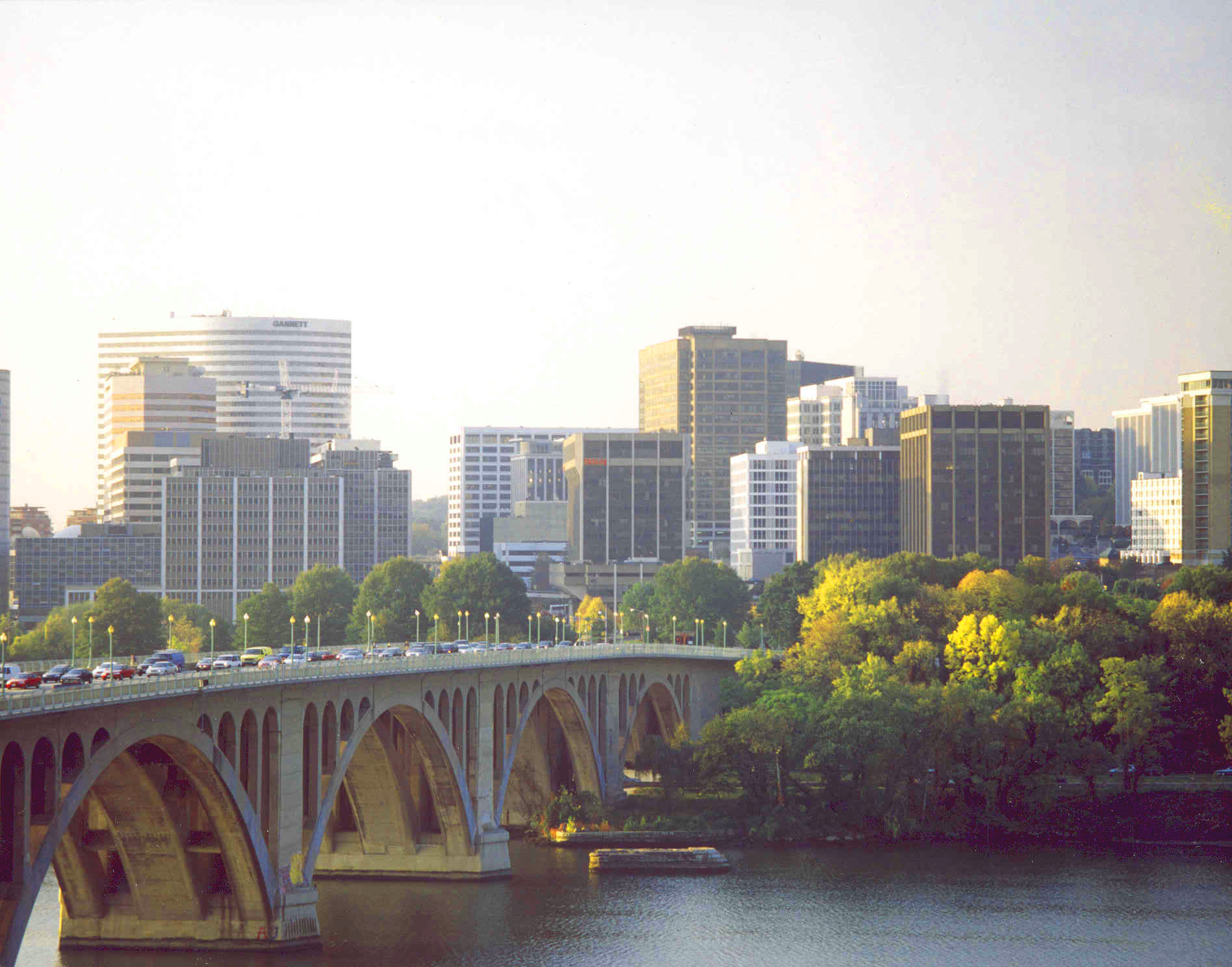
The southern terminus of Key Bridge and remaining pier and abutment of Aqueduct Bridge in 2005

Key Bridge spans the Potomac River, connecting the Georgetown neighborhood in the District of Columbia with the neighborhood of Rosslyn in Arlington County, Virginia. Key Bridge is Washington's oldest existing road bridge across the Potomac River.

The bridge is an open-spandrel, arched structure oriented in a north-south direction and constructed of reinforced concrete and steel. Each span consists of three steel arches: A center arch which is 22 feet (6.7 m) in width, and two outer arches each 11 feet (3.4 m) in width. To lighten the load on the span arches, the spandrels were filled with additional arches. Depending on the size of the span, there are either three or four spandrel arches. Together, the span arch and spandrel arches form a truss. The piers were decorated with pilasters in the Doric style.

The northern terminus of the bridge is just east of the site of Francis Scott Key's home, which was dismantled in the late 1940s. A park honoring Key now occupies the site. The bridge connects with M Street NW, Canal Road NW, and the Whitehurst Freeway (which provides access to K Street NW and downtown). The northbound span has an exit ramp to the eastbound Whitehurst Freeway; however, traffic from the westbound Whitehurst Freeway to the southbound span must use M Street.

The southern terminus of the bridge is in the state of Virginia. Northbound traffic accesses the bridge via North Lynn Street, with southbound traffic exits the bridge via North Fort Myer Drive. A cloverleaf ramp from southbound George Washington Memorial Parkway connects to northbound North Lynn Street just before the bridge. Southbound traffic may turn right onto an off-ramp leading to northbound George Washington Memorial Parkway. The bridge's southbound off-ramp connect with north/west-bound U.S. Route 29. Traffic wishing to access southbound Interstate 66 (the Custis Memorial Parkway) must do so by traversing local Rosslyn streets.

The bridge originally measured 1,450 feet (440 m) in length, with a roadway 85 feet (26 m) above the average water level. The original road deck was 70 feet (21 m) wide. It included two 16-foot (4.9 m) wide traffic lanes, a center lane with streetcar tracks, and two 8-foot (2.4 m) wide sidewalks. A horizontal, decorative molding ran along the outer edge of the bridge. It projected outward by 2 feet (0.61 m). Atop this cornice was a paneled parapet. The parapet (or railing) was 4 feet (1.2 m) high and 1 foot (0.30 m) thick. Between each baluster of the parapet is a 6-foot (1.8 m) recessed panel. Atop the parapet were street lights. These were made of cast iron, were 7-foot-1-inch (2.16 m) tall, and featured a griffin's leg and winged shield at the base. The light were spaced 40 feet (12 m) apart.

The bridge had five arches when constructed. The central arch was 208 feet (63 m) long, and the two adjacent arches were 204 feet (62 m) long. The shoreward arches were each 187 feet (57 m) long. Separate spans completed the approaches to the bridge. The span over the Chesapeake and Ohio Canal in the District of Columbia was either 82 feet (25 m) or 85 feet (26 m) long (sources vary), while the span over K Street NW was 180 feet (55 m) long. The original approach span on the Virginia side was 152 feet (46 m) long.

== Renovations and alterations ==
=== 1938–40 alterations ===
Francis Scott Key Bridge was altered in 1938-40 when Congress extended the George Washington Memorial Parkway north along the Virginia shoreline past Key Bridge. A new 152-foot (46 m) span over the parkway was added in 1939, giving the bridge an eighth span. Sources vary significantly as to the bridge's new length, with estimates including 1,635 feet (498 m), 1,781 feet (543 m), 1,791 feet (546 m), and 1,791 feet 6 inches (546.05 m).

=== 1955–57 alterations ===
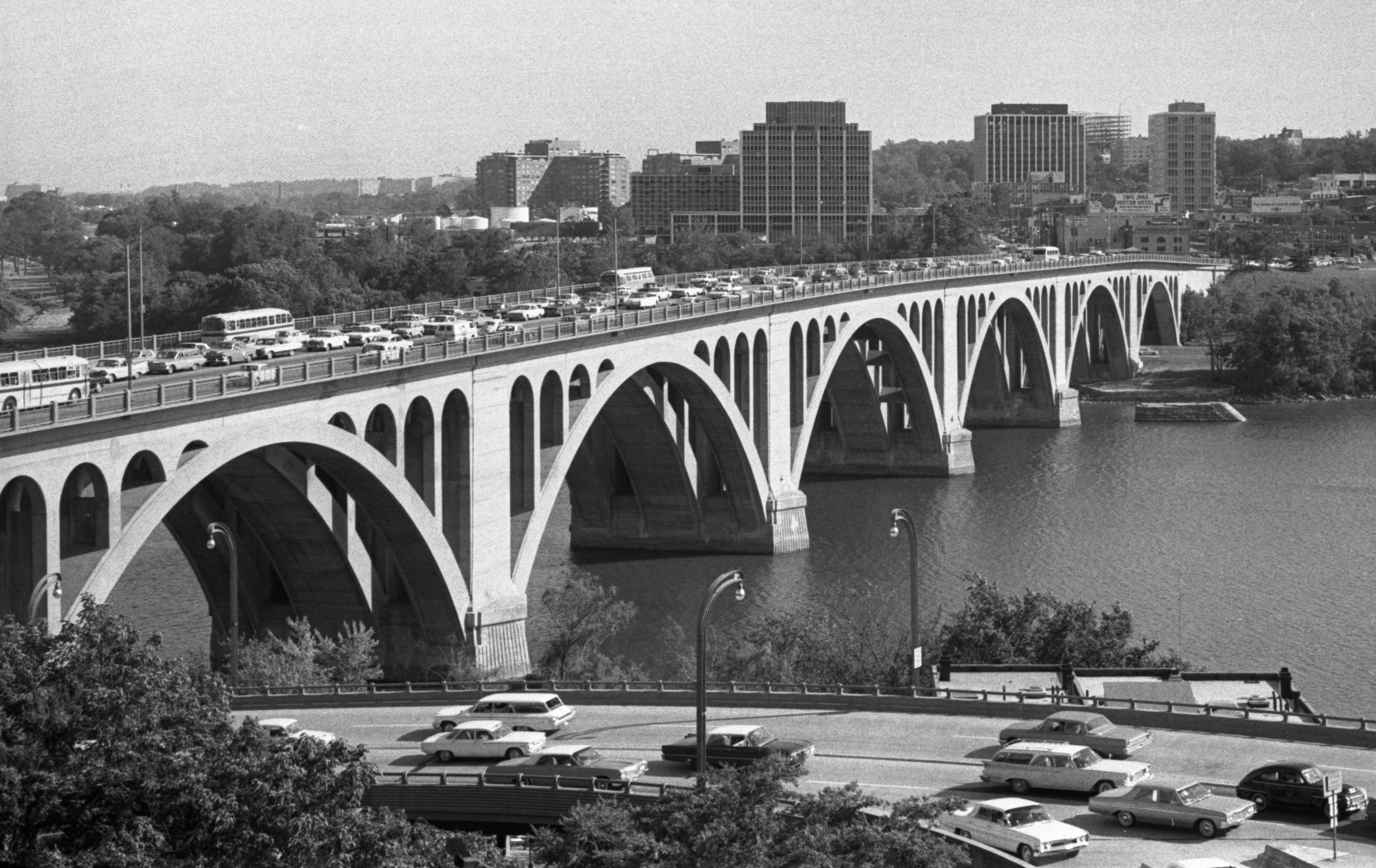
The Key Bridge in 1964

Another major alteration to the bridge was initiated in 1955 when the bridge was widened to 80 feet (24 m), which allowed the roadway itself to be widened to 66 feet (20 m). A 2-foot-high (0.61 m) guard rail was added between the roadway and the sidewalks, which necessitated narrowing the sidewalks to just 5 feet 3 inches (1.60 m). The parapet and original street lights were also removed. A steel railing was added on the external side of the sidewalks, and 30-foot-high (9.1 m) "cobrahead" aluminum lampposts were installed every 120 feet (37 m). At the time, Capital Transit was offered the choice of removing the tracks for $50,000-$100,000 or replacing them for $250,000-$300,000 and in 1955 it chose to remove and replace service with a bus. A few months later D.C. Transit, which took over from Capital Transit in the summer of 1956, was ordered to remove all the tracks and streetcars in 7 years and so the choice made even more sense. The last streetcar ran across the bridge on August 26, 1956, and the tracks were removed later that year.

The bridge with 6 lanes first opened for use on March 4, 1957.

=== 1987 deck replacement ===
An entirely new roadway deck was installed in 1986–87. The new road deck was a bonded post-tensioned concrete deck 90 feet (27 m) in width. The roadway width remained the same, but the extra deck width allowed the sidewalks to be widened to 9 feet 10 inches (3.00 m). The 1955 railing was removed, and a precast concrete parapet 2 feet 8 inches (0.81 m) high with 6-foot (1.8 m) recessed panels between the balusters was installed. The new parapet resembles the 1923 railing. Atop the new parapet is a 5-foot-high (1.5 m) steel railing designed to act as a suicide prevention measure. The new steel railing has 0.75-inch-wide (1.9 cm) bars set 4 inches (10 cm) apart. Type 16 Washington Upright Lampposts, each 14 feet (4.3 m) high, were installed above the apex of each arch and atop each pier.

On March 1, 1996, the Key Bridge was added to the National Register of Historic Places.

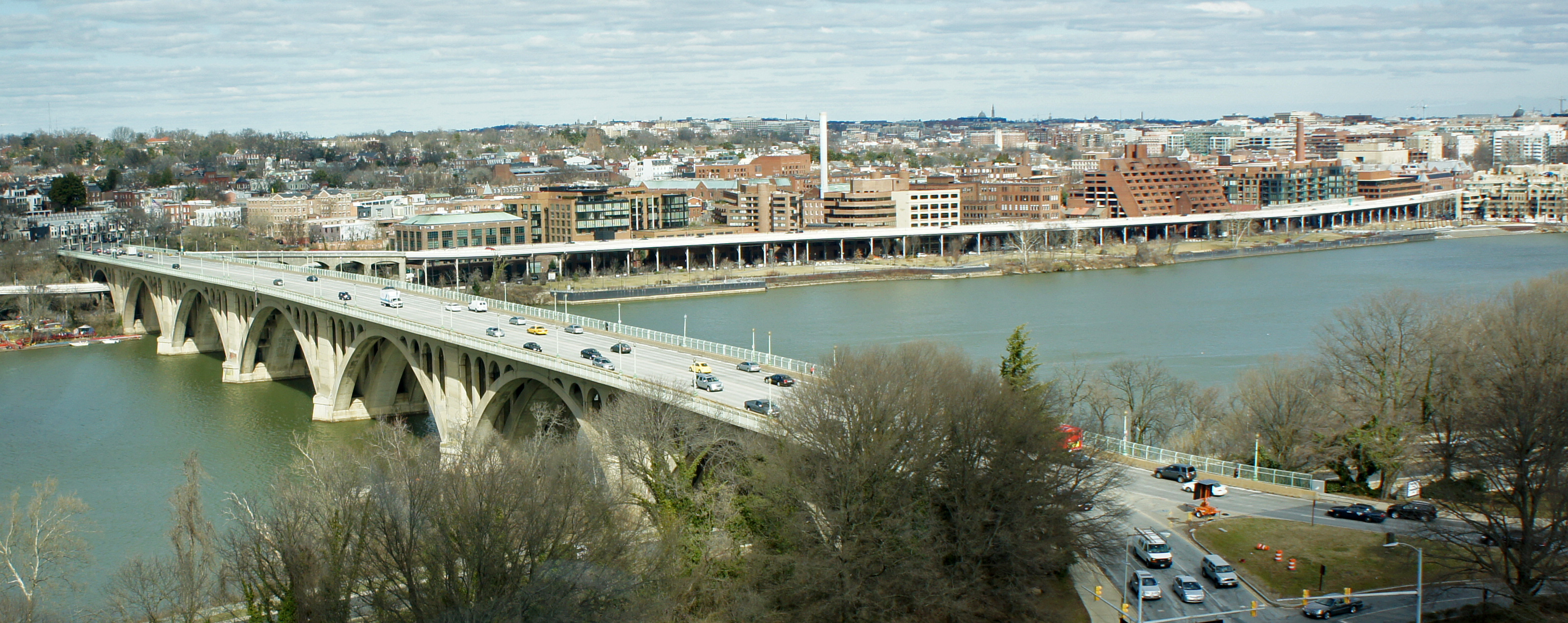
A panoramic view of Key Bridge in 2013

=== 2014 and 2016 rehabilitations ===
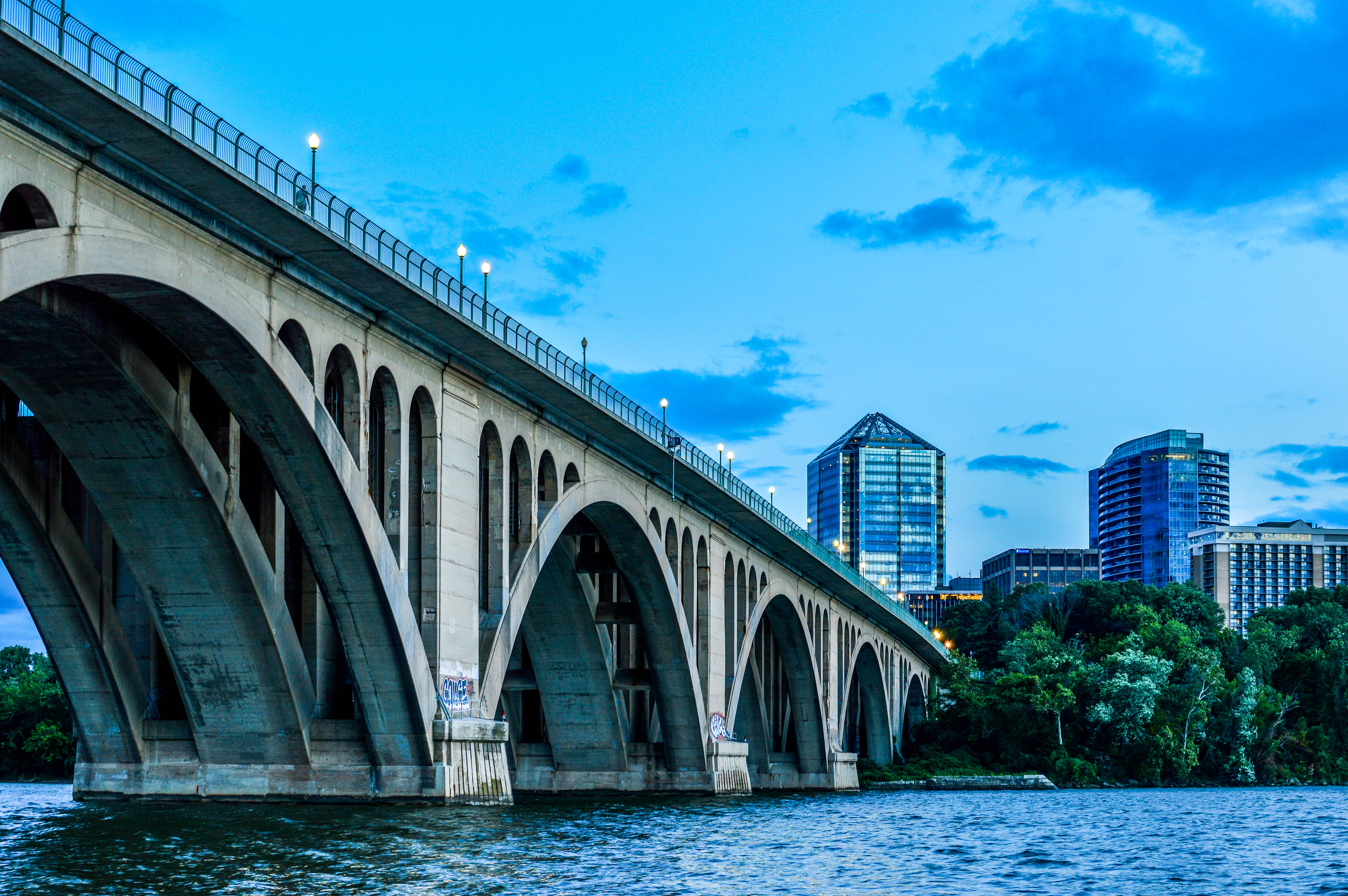
View of Francis Scott Key Bridge seen from across the Potomac River in Georgetoown in July 2014

In 2011, Key Bridge underwent a major inspection. Officials were concerned that the chemical agents used to bond the tensioned cables running through the concrete road deck were corroding the concrete. The architectural engineering firm of Johnson, Mirmiran & Thompson (JMT) was hired to inspect the bridge. JMT discovered that the deck slab was ready to fail, and there was extensive corrosive deterioration of the underside of the concrete deck. Cracks were also found in some of the abutments, arches and spandrel arches, concrete deck, and piers. The sonic echo/impulse response method was used to identify areas within the concrete where cables had disintegrated or where corrosion had created voids. JMT restored some deteriorated portions of the deck. The bridge was rated "structurally deficient" after these tests.

In 2013, Key Bridge carried about 62,000 vehicles each day. The Washington Post in April 2014 called Key Bridge one of the three "busiest deficient bridges" in the District of Columbia, along with Arlington Memorial Bridge and the connection between Park Road and the Anacostia Freeway.

In April 2014, the District of Columbia Department of Transportation (DDOT) announced a two-year, $21 million rehabilitation of the bridge. In addition to repairing the previously-identified structural issues, the street lights were replaced with modern energy-efficient lampposts, the guard rail between the roadway and sidewalks was strengthened, the bridge's drainage system fixed and improved, and the bridge painted.

In fall 2015, a second round of rehabilitation work on Key Bridge was scheduled, although the contract was not announced until October 2015, delaying work about six months. The two-year, $30 million project was intended to replace more street lights with modern fixtures, strengthen the deck overhangs on both sides of the bridge, repair the concrete deck beneath the roadway, repair cracked and broken portions of the concrete superstructure, repair the reinforced concrete beams beneath the concrete deck, improve drainage, and clad the footings of the piers with "fiber-reinforced polymer jackets" to inhibit corrosion. The right lanes of the bridge is being treated with a resin as a test to see if the material will help reduce water infiltration and corrosion. Minor repairs and alterations will also improve pedestrian and bicycle safety on the ramp to the eastbound Whitehurst Freeway. These include removing bollards that narrow the sidewalk, and installing cameras that detect pedestrians and bicycles and will trigger flashing lights on the ramp to warn motorists about their presence. Work began in October 2016 and was to last two years, but was still ongoing in August 2019.

== See also ==
- Architecture of Washington, D.C.
- Key House
- List of bridges documented by the Historic American Engineering Record in Washington, D.C.
- List of bridges on the National Register of Historic Places in Virginia
- List of bridges on the National Register of Historic Places in Washington, D.C.
- National Register of Historic Places listings in Arlington County, Virginia
- National Register of Historic Places listings in Washington, D.C.

== Bibliography ==
- Commission of Fine Arts (1917). Report of the Commission of Fine Arts for the Fiscal Year Ended June 30, 1916. Washington, D.C.: Government Printing Office. hdl:2027/coo.31924106244548.
- Commission of Fine Arts (1918). Report of the Commission of Fine Arts. June 30, 1916 to January 1, 1918. Washington, D.C.: Government Printing Office. hdl:2027/coo.31924106244548.
- Commission of Fine Arts (1920). Report of the Commission of Fine Arts. Eighth Report January 1, 1918 to July 1, 1919. Washington, D.C.: Government Printing Office. hdl:2027/coo.31924106244548.
- D.C. Historic Preservation Division (December 19, 1995). Francis Scott Key Bridge. National Register of Historic Places Registration Form. NPS Form 10-900 (Rev. 10-90) (PDF) (Report). National Park Service. United States Department of the Interior.
- Emery, Fred A. (1938). "Washington's Historic Bridges". Records of the Columbia Historical Society, Washington, D.C.: 49–70.
- Goode, James M. (2003). Capital Losses: A Cultural History of Washington's Destroyed Buildings. Washington, D.C.: Smithsonian Books. ISBN 9781588341051.
- Jackson, Donald C. (1988). Great American Bridges and Dams: A National Trust Guide. Hoboken, N.J.: John Wiley and Sons. ISBN 0471143855.
- Myer, Donald Beekman (1974). Bridges and the City of Washington. Washington, D.C.: U.S. Commission of Fine Arts.
- Scott, Pamela; Lee, Antoinette Josephine (1993). Buildings of the District of Columbia. Oxford, U.K.: Oxford University Press. ISBN 0195061462.
