= Quality Hill, Washington, D.C. =

Historic house in Washington, D.C., United States

- Quality Hill
- U.S. National Register of Historic Places
- D.C. Inventory of Historic Sites
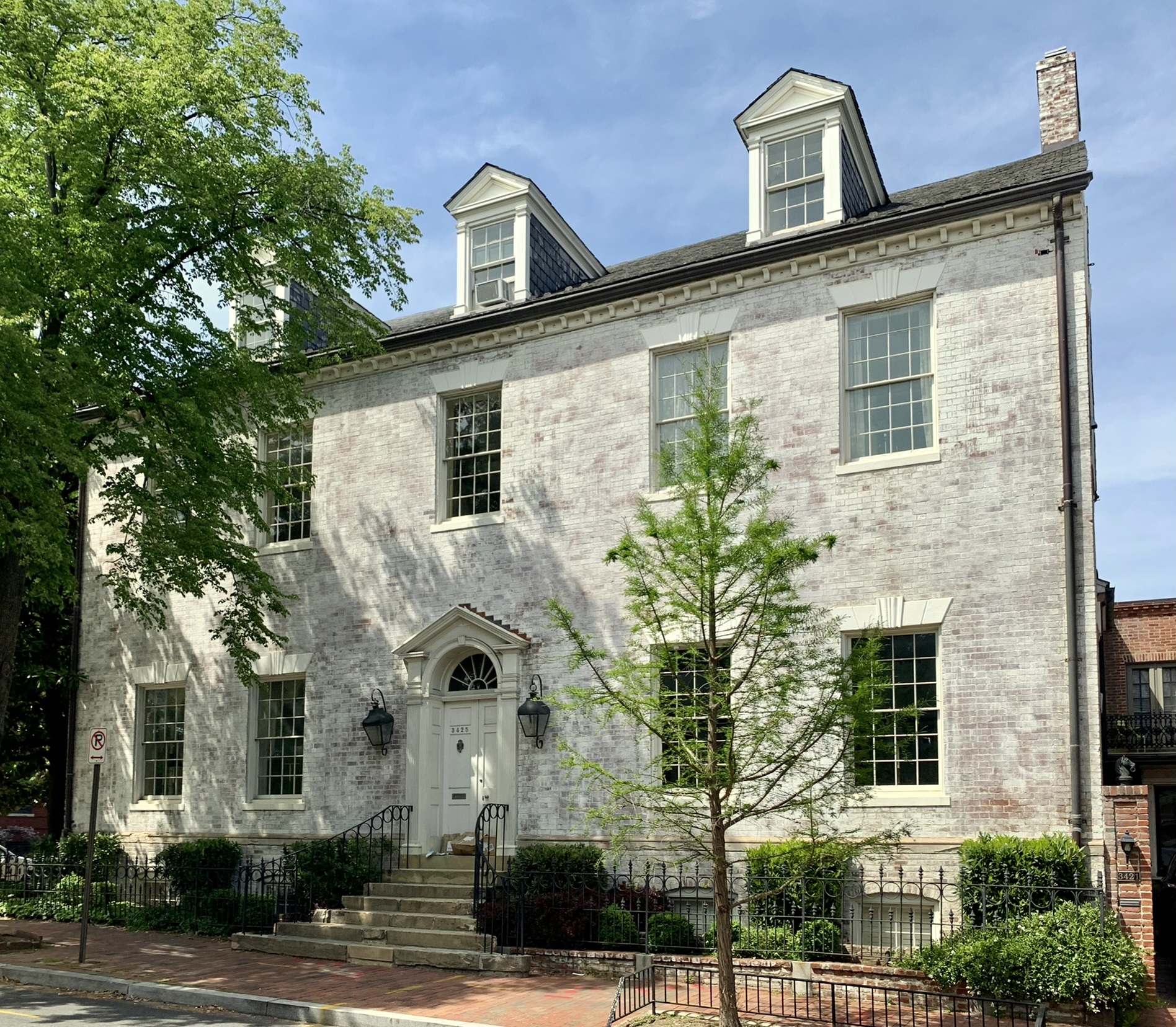
- Quality Hill in 2022

- Location within Washington, D.C.
- Location: 3425 Prospect Street, N.W. Washington, D.C.
- Coordinates: 38°54′22″N 77°4′9″W
- Built: 1798
- Architectural style: Georgian
- Part of: Georgetown, Washington, D.C. (ID67000025)
- NRHP reference No.: 72001431

Significant dates
- Added to NRHP: March 16, 1972
- Designated DCIHS: November 8, 1964

Quality Hill, also known as the John Thomson Mason House, is a historic building, located at 3425 Prospect Street, Northwest, Washington, D.C., in the Georgetown neighborhood.

== History ==
John Thomson Mason, a nephew of George Mason, bought the house in 1798. John and Elizabeth Teakle bought the house in 1807. Dr. Charles Worthington bought the house in 1810. Albert Adsit Clemons, owner of Halcyon House bought the house in 1915. Senator and Mrs. Claiborne Pell bought the house in 1961. Since 2019 the house has served as the Washington, DC headquarters of the Calvin Coolidge Presidential Foundation.
