= Francis Scott Key =

American lawyer and poet (1779–1843)

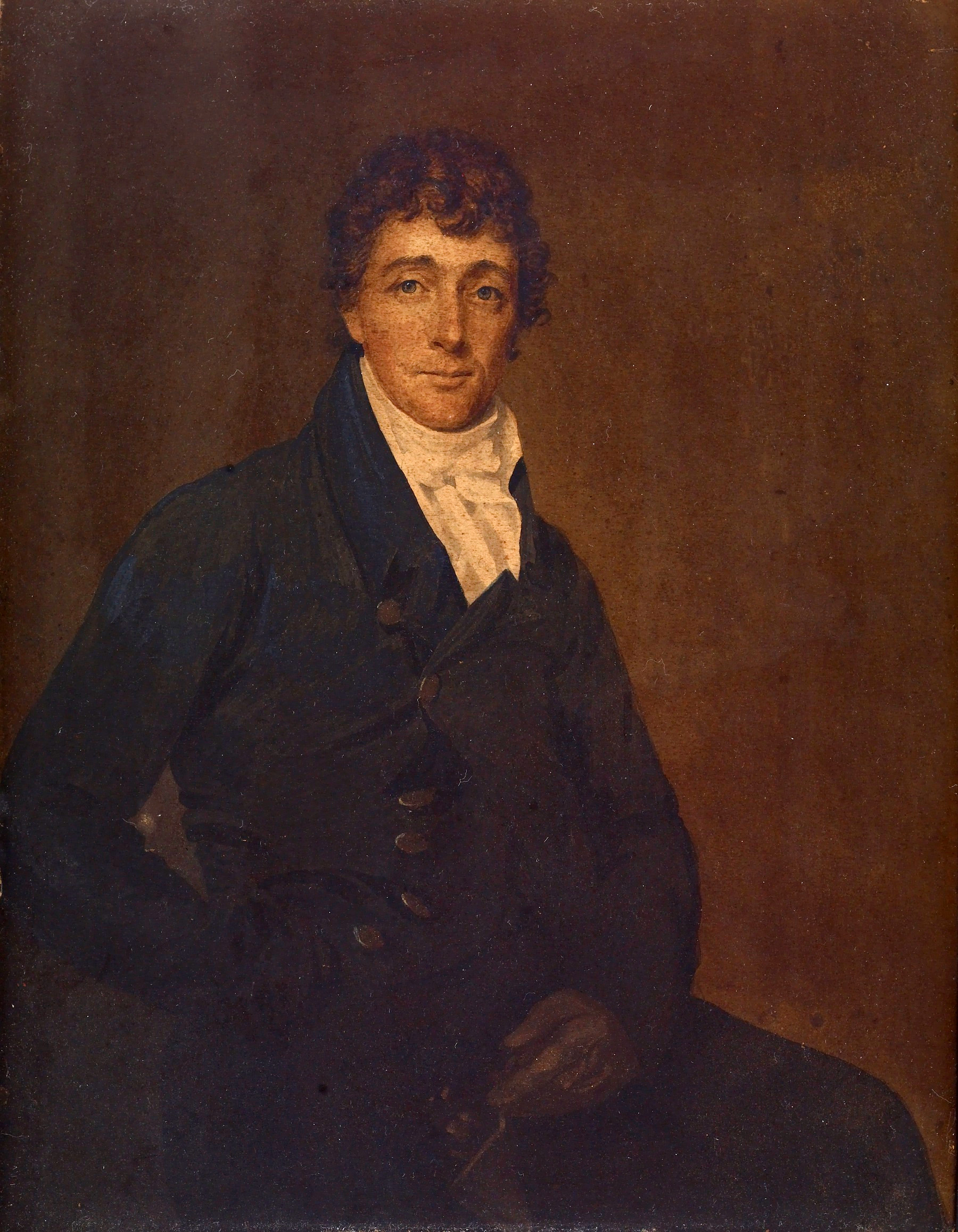
- Key c. 1825

4th United States Attorney for the District of Columbia
- In office 1833–1841
- President: Andrew Jackson; Martin Van Buren
- Preceded by: Thomas Swann
- Succeeded by: Philip Richard Fendall II

Personal details
- Born: August 1, 1779 Frederick County, Maryland (now Carroll County), U.S.
- Died: January 11, 1843 (aged 63) Baltimore, Maryland, U.S.
- Resting place: Mt. Olivet Cemetery
- Spouse: Mary Tayloe Lloyd (m. 1802)
- Children: 11, including Philip
- Relatives: Philip Barton Key (uncle) John Tayloe II (grandfather) John Tayloe III (uncle) Francis Key Howard (grandson) F. Scott Fitzgerald (distant cousin) Roger B. Taney (brother-in-law)
- Occupation: Poet; lawyer

Francis Scott Key (August 1, 1779 – January 11, 1843) was an American lawyer, author, and poet from Frederick, Maryland, best known as the author of the poem "Defence of Fort M'Henry", which was set to a popular British tune and eventually became the American national anthem "The Star-Spangled Banner". In 1814 Key observed the British bombardment of Fort McHenry in Baltimore during the War of 1812. He was inspired upon seeing an American flag flying over the fort at dawn: his poem was published within a week with the suggested tune of the popular song "To Anacreon in Heaven". The song with Key's lyrics became known as "The Star-Spangled Banner" and slowly gained in popularity as an unofficial anthem, finally achieving official status as the national anthem more than a century later in 1931.

Key was a lawyer in Maryland and Washington, D.C., for four decades and worked on important cases, including the Burr conspiracy trial, and he argued numerous times before the Supreme Court. He was nominated for District Attorney for the District of Columbia by President Andrew Jackson, where he served from 1833 to 1841.

Key owned slaves from 1800, during which time abolitionists ridiculed his words, claiming that America was more like the "Land of the Free and Home of the Oppressed". As District Attorney, he suppressed abolitionists, and he lost a case against Reuben Crandall in 1836 where he accused the defendant's abolitionist publications of instigating slaves to rebel. He was also a leader of the American Colonization Society which sent former slaves to Africa. He freed some of his slaves in the 1830s, paying one as his farm foreman to supervise his other slaves. He publicly criticized slavery and gave free legal representation to some slaves seeking freedom, but he also represented owners of runaway slaves. He had eight slaves at the time of his death.

Key was also a devout and prominent Episcopalian.

== Early life ==
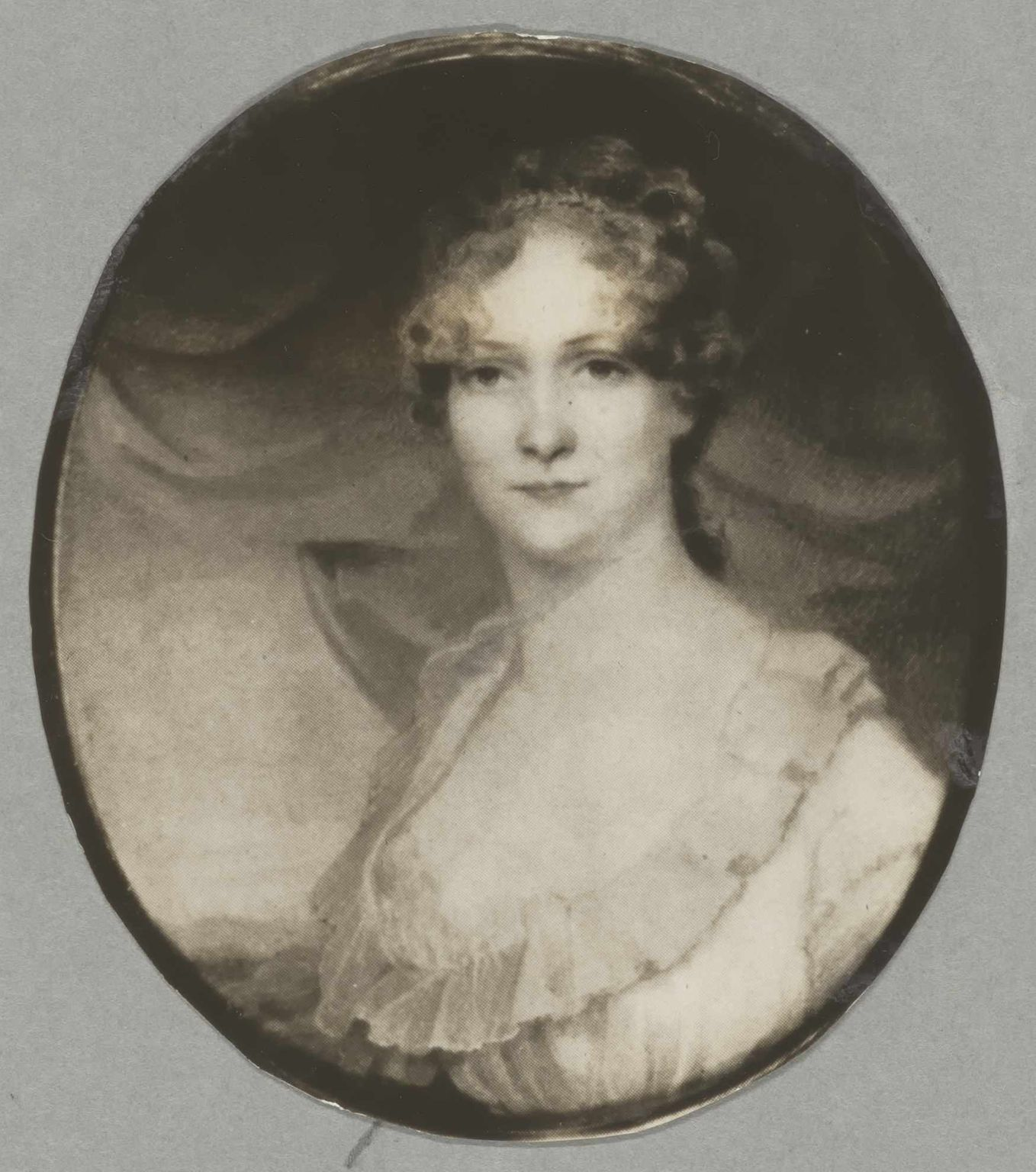
Mary Tayloe Lloyd, early 1800s

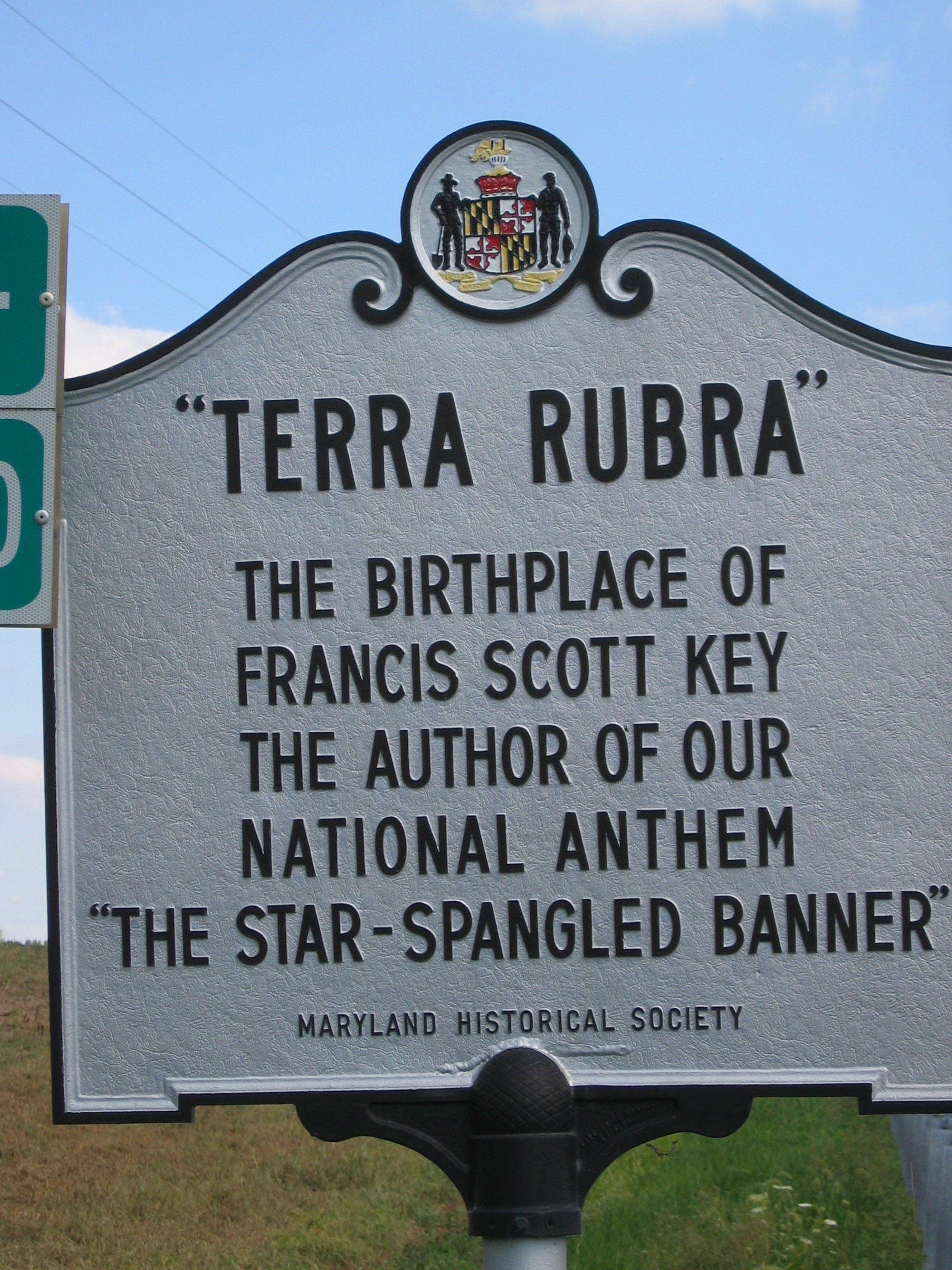
Maryland Historical Society plaque marking Key's birthplace

Key was born into an affluent family. Key's father John Ross Key, of English descent, was a lawyer, a commissioned officer in the Continental Army, and a judge. His mother, Ann Phoebe Dagworthy Charlton (February 6, 1756 – 1830), was born to Arthur Charlton, a tavern keeper, and his wife, Eleanor Harrison of Frederick, in the colony of Maryland.

Key grew up on the family plantation Terra Rubra in Frederick County, Maryland, which is now in Carroll County. He graduated from St. John's College, Annapolis, Maryland, in 1796 and read law under his uncle Philip Barton Key who was loyal to the British Crown during the War of Independence. He married Mary Tayloe Lloyd on January 1, 1802, daughter of Edward Lloyd IV of Wye House and Elizabeth Tayloe, daughter of John Tayloe II of Mount Airy and sister of John Tayloe III of The Octagon House. The couple raised their 11 children in their Georgetown residence, the Key House.

== "The Star-Spangled Banner" ==
Key and Colonel John Stuart Skinner dined aboard HMS Tonnant on September 7, 1814, following the burning of Washington in August. They were the guests of Vice-Admiral Alexander Cochrane, Rear-Admiral George Cockburn, and Major-General Robert Ross. Skinner and Key were there to plead for the release of Dr. William Beanes, a physician who resided in Upper Marlboro, Maryland, and a friend of Key who had been captured in his home on August 28. Beanes was accused of aiding the detention of several British Army stragglers who were ransacking local homes in search of food. Skinner, Key, and the released Beanes were allowed to return under guard to their own truce ship, but they were not allowed to go ashore because they had become familiar with the strength and position of the British units and their intention to launch an attack on Baltimore. Key was unable to do anything but watch the 25-hour bombardment of the American forces at Fort McHenry during the Battle of Baltimore from dawn of September 13 to the next morning.

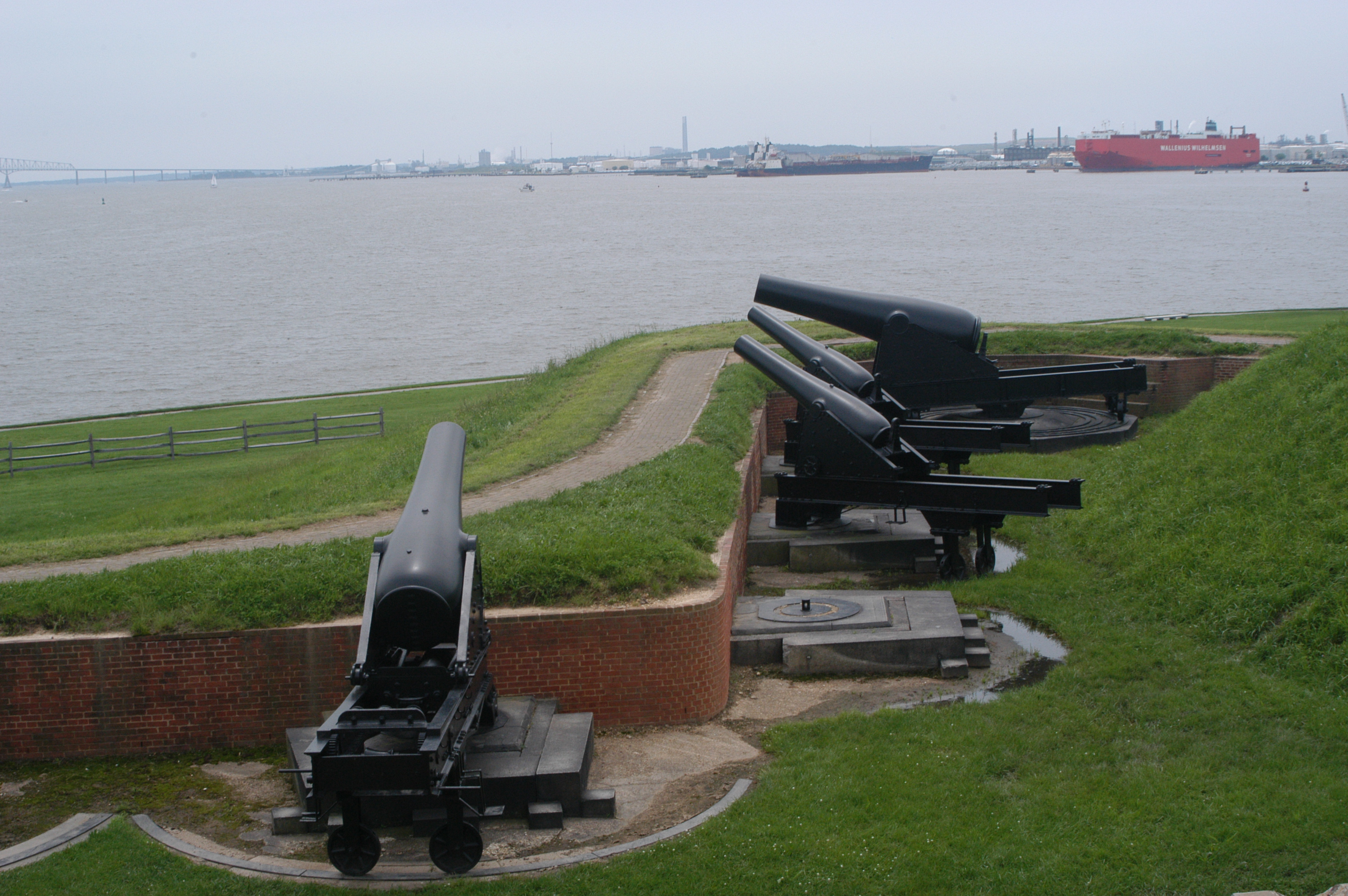
Fort McHenry looking towards the position of the British ships, with the Francis Scott Key Bridge in the distance on the upper left

At dawn, Key was able to see a large American flag waving over the fort, and he started writing a poem about his experience on the back of a letter that he had kept in his pocket. On September 16, Key, Skinner, and Beanes were released from the fleet. When they arrived in Baltimore that evening, Key completed the poem in his room at the Indian Queen Hotel. His untitled and unsigned manuscript was printed as a broadside the next day under the title "Defence of Fort M'Henry", with the notation: "Tune – Anacreon in Heaven". This was a popular tune that Key had already used as a setting for his 1805 song "When the Warrior Returns", celebrating American heroes of the First Barbary War. It was published in newspapers, first in Baltimore and then across the nation, under the new title The Star-Spangled Banner. It was somewhat difficult to sing, yet it became increasingly popular, competing with "Hail, Columbia" (1796) as the de facto national anthem by the time of the Mexican–American War and the American Civil War. The song was finally adopted as the American national anthem more than a century after its first publication by Act of Congress in 1931, signed by President Herbert Hoover.

== Legal career ==
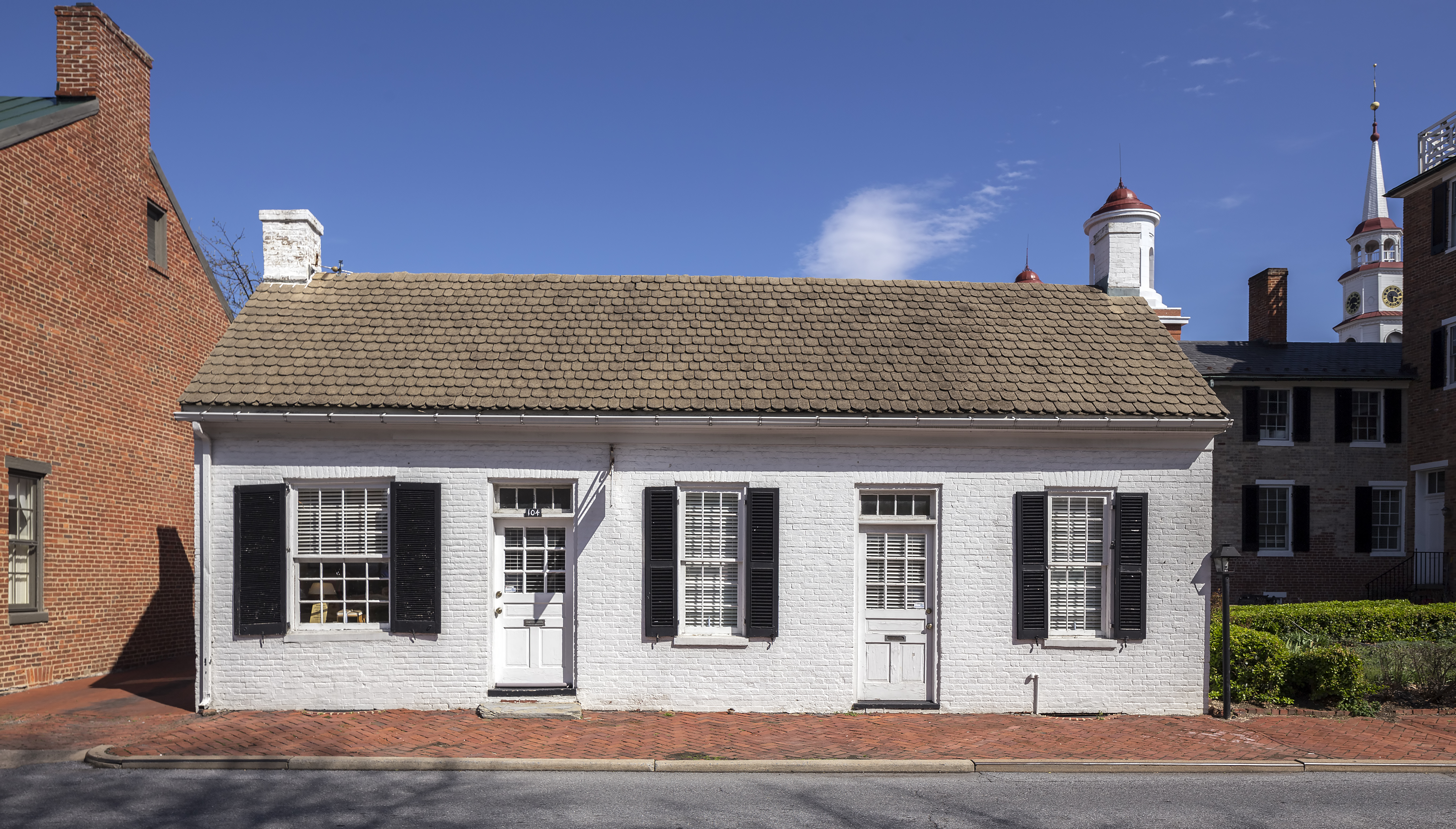
Key law office on Court Street in Frederick, Maryland

Key was a leading attorney in Frederick, Maryland, and Washington, D.C., for many years, with an extensive real estate and trial practice. He and his family settled in Georgetown in 1805 or 1806, near the new national capital. He assisted his uncle Philip Barton Key in the sensational conspiracy trial of Aaron Burr and in the expulsion of Senator John Smith of Ohio. He made the first of his many arguments before the United States Supreme Court in 1807. In 1808, he assisted President Thomas Jefferson's attorney general in United States v. Peters.

In 1829, Key assisted in the prosecution of Tobias Watkins, former U.S. Treasury auditor under President John Quincy Adams, for misappropriating public funds. He also handled the Petticoat affair concerning Secretary of War John Eaton, and he served as the attorney for Sam Houston in 1832 during his trial for assaulting Representative William Stanbery of Ohio. After years as an adviser to President Jackson, Key was nominated by the President to District Attorney for the District of Columbia in 1833. He served from 1833 to 1841 while also handling his own private legal cases. In 1835, he prosecuted Richard Lawrence for his attempt to assassinate President Jackson at the top steps of the Capitol, the first attempt to kill an American president.

== Key and slavery ==
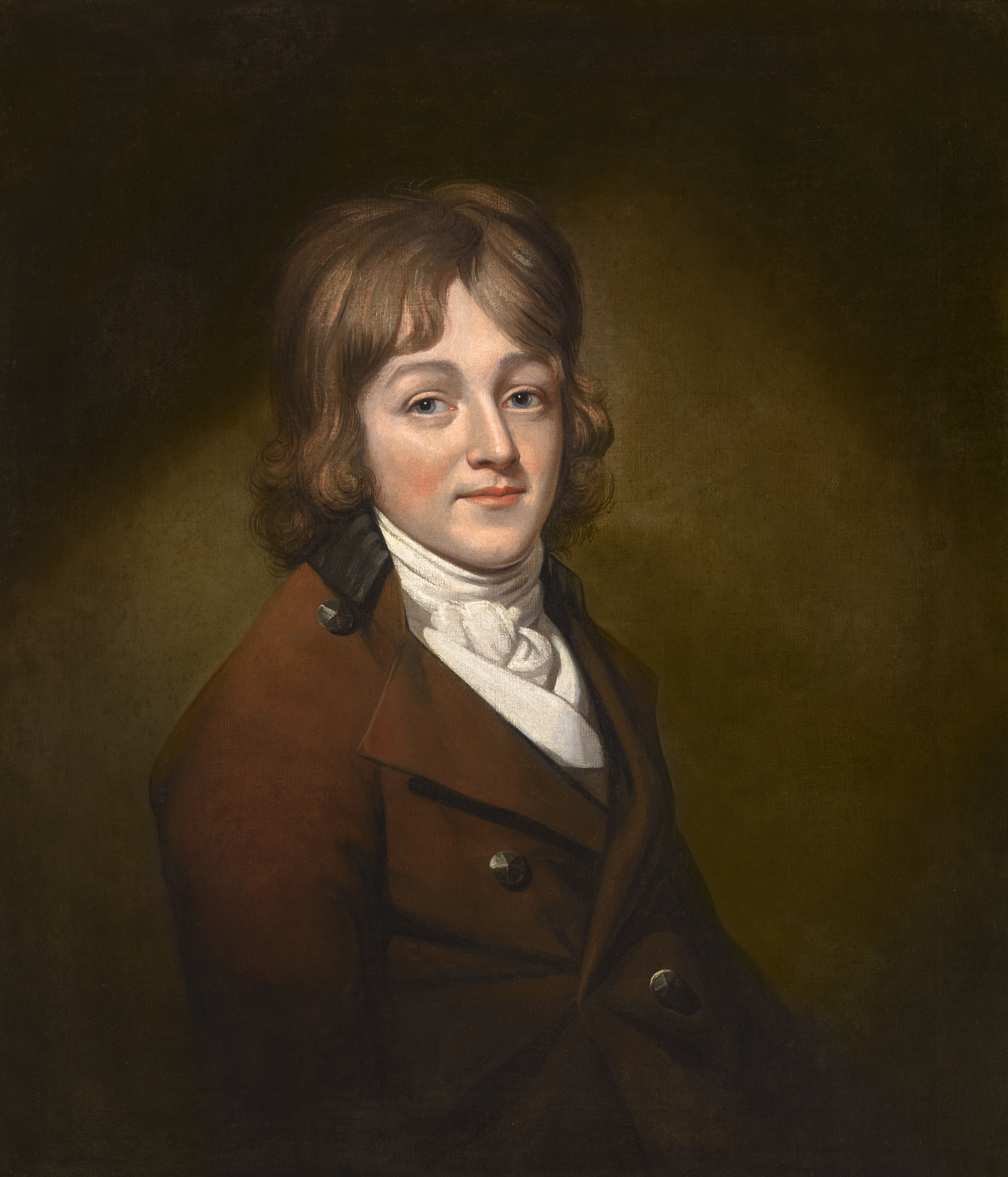
Portrait of Key by Rembrandt Peale, c. 1796

Key purchased his first slave in 1800 or 1801 and owned six slaves in 1820. He freed seven in the 1830s, and owned eight when he died. One of his freed slaves continued to work for him for wages as his farm's foreman, supervising several slaves. Key also represented several slaves seeking their freedom, as well as several slave-owners seeking return of their runaway slaves. Key was one of the executors of John Randolph of Roanoke's will, which freed his 400 slaves, and Key fought to enforce the will for the next decade and to provide the freedmen and women with land to support themselves.

Key is known to have publicly criticized slavery's cruelties, and a newspaper editorial stated that "he often volunteered to defend the downtrodden sons and daughters of Africa." The editor said that Key "convinced me that slavery was wrong—radically wrong".

A quote increasingly credited to Key stating that free black people are "a distinct and inferior race of people, which all experience proves to be the greatest evil that afflicts a community" is erroneous. The quote is taken from an 1838 letter that Key wrote to Reverend Benjamin Tappan of Maine who had sent Key a questionnaire about the attitudes of Southern religious institutions about slavery. Rather than representing a statement by Key identifying his personal thoughts, the words quoted are offered by Key to describe the attitudes of others who assert that former slaves could not remain in the U.S. as paid laborers. This was the official policy of the American Colonization Society. Key was an ACS leader and fundraiser for the organization, but he himself did not send the men and women he freed to Africa upon their emancipation. The original confusion around this quote arises from ambiguities in the 1937 biography of Key by Edward S. Delaplaine.

Key was a founding member and active leader of the American Colonization Society (ACS), whose primary goal was to send free black people to Africa. Though many free black people were born in the United States by this time, historians argue that upper-class American society, of which Key was a part, could never "envision a multiracial society". The ACS was not supported by most abolitionists or free black people of the time, but the organization's work would eventually lead to the creation of Liberia in 1847.

=== Anti-abolitionism ===
In the early 1830s American thinking on slavery changed quite abruptly. Considerable opposition to the American Colonization Society's project emerged. Led by newspaper editor and publisher William Lloyd Garrison, a growing portion of the population noted that only a very small number of free black people were actually moved, and they faced brutal conditions in West Africa, with very high mortality. Free Black people made it clear that few of them wanted to move, and if they did, it would be to Canada, Mexico, or Central America, not Africa. The leaders of the American Colonization Society, including Key, were predominantly slave owners. The Society was intended to preserve slavery, rather than eliminate it. In the words of philanthropist Gerrit Smith, it was "quite as much an Anti-Abolition, as Colonization Society". "This Colonization Society had, by an invisible process, half conscious, half unconscious, been transformed into a serviceable organ and member of the Slave Power."

The alternative to the colonization of Africa, project of the American Colonization Society, was the total and immediate abolition of slavery in the United States. This Key was firmly against, with or without slave owner compensation, and he used his position as District Attorney to attack abolitionists. In 1833, he secured a grand jury indictment against Benjamin Lundy, editor of the anti-slavery publication Genius of Universal Emancipation, and his printer William Greer, for libel after Lundy published an article that declared, "There is neither mercy nor justice for colored people in this district [of Columbia]". Lundy's article, Key said in the indictment, "was intended to injure, oppress, aggrieve, and vilify the good name, fame, credit & reputation of the Magistrates and constables" of Washington. Lundy left town rather than face trial; Greer was acquitted.

==== Prosecution of Reuben Crandall ====
In a larger unsuccessful prosecution, in August 1836 Key obtained an indictment against Reuben Crandall, brother of controversial Connecticut teacher Prudence Crandall, who had recently moved to Washington, D.C. It accused Crandall of "seditious libel" after two marshals (who operated as slave catchers in their off hours) found Crandall had a trunk full of anti-slavery publications in his Georgetown residence and office, five days after the Snow riot, caused by rumors that a mentally ill slave had attempted to kill an elderly white woman. In an April 1837 trial that attracted nationwide attention and that congressmen attended, Key charged that Crandall's publications instigated slaves to rebel. Crandall's attorneys acknowledged he opposed slavery, but denied any intent or actions to encourage rebellion. Evidence was introduced that the anti-slavery publications were packing materials used by his landlady in shipping his possessions to him. He had not "published" anything; he had given one copy to one man who had asked for it.

Key, in his final address to the jury said:

Are you willing, gentlemen, to abandon your country, to permit it to be taken from you, and occupied by the abolitionist, according to whose taste it is to associate and amalgamate with the negro? Or, gentlemen, on the other hand, are there laws in this community to defend you from the immediate abolitionist, who would open upon you the floodgates of such extensive wickedness and mischief?

The jury acquitted Crandall of all charges. This public and humiliating defeat, as well as family tragedies in 1835, diminished Key's political ambition. He resigned as District Attorney in 1840. He remained a staunch proponent of African colonization and a strong critic of the abolition movement until his death.

Crandall died shortly after his acquittal of pneumonia contracted in the Washington jail.

== Religion ==
Key was a devout and prominent Episcopalian. In his youth, he almost became an Episcopal priest rather than a lawyer. Throughout his life he sprinkled biblical references in his correspondence. He was active in All Saints Parish in Frederick, Maryland, near his family's home. He also helped found or financially support several parishes in the new national capital, including St. John's Episcopal Church in Georgetown, Trinity Episcopal Church in present-day Judiciary Square, and Christ Church in Alexandria (at the time, in the District of Columbia). He was described as a "devoted and intimate friend" of Bishop William Meade of Virginia, and his "good literary taste" was credited for the quality of the church's hymnal.

From 1818 until his death in 1843, Key was associated with the American Bible Society. He successfully opposed an abolitionist resolution presented to that group around 1838.

Key also helped found two Episcopal seminaries, one in Baltimore and the other across the Potomac River in Alexandria (the Virginia Theological Seminary). Key also published a prose work called The Power of Literature, and Its Connection with Religion, in 1834.

== Death and legacy ==
The Howard family vault at Saint Paul's Cemetery, Baltimore, Maryland

On January 11, 1843, Key died at the home of his daughter Elizabeth Howard in Baltimore from pleurisy at age 63. He was initially interred in Old Saint Paul's Cemetery in the vault of John Eager Howard but in 1866, his body was moved to his family plot in Frederick at Mount Olivet Cemetery.

The Key Monument Association erected a memorial in 1898 and the remains of both Francis Scott Key and his wife, Mary Tayloe Lloyd, were placed in a crypt in the base of the monument.

Despite several efforts to preserve it, the Francis Scott Key residence was ultimately dismantled in 1947. The residence had been located at 3516–18 M Street in Georgetown.

Though Key had written poetry from time to time, often with heavily religious themes, these works were not collected and published until 14 years after his death, in 1857. Two of his religious poems used as Christian hymns include "Before the Lord We Bow" and "Lord, with Glowing Heart I'd Praise Thee".

In 1806, Key's sister, Anne Phoebe Charlton Key, married Roger B. Taney, who would later become Chief Justice of the United States. In 1846 one daughter, Alice, married U.S. Senator George H. Pendleton and another, Ellen Lloyd, married Simon F. Blunt. In 1859, Key's son Philip Barton Key II, who also served as United States Attorney for the District of Columbia, was shot and killed by Daniel Sickles‍—‌a U.S. Representative from New York who would serve as a general in the American Civil War‍—‌after he discovered that Philip Barton Key was having an affair with his wife. Sickles was acquitted in the first use of the temporary insanity defense. In 1861, Key's grandson Francis Key Howard was imprisoned in Fort McHenry with the Mayor of Baltimore George William Brown and other locals deemed to be Confederate sympathizers.

F. Scott Fitzgerald, whose full name was Francis Scott Key Fitzgerald, was a distant cousin and the namesake of Key. Key's direct descendants include geneticist Thomas Hunt Morgan, guitarist Dana Key, and American fashion designer and socialite Pauline de Rothschild.

== Monuments and memorials ==
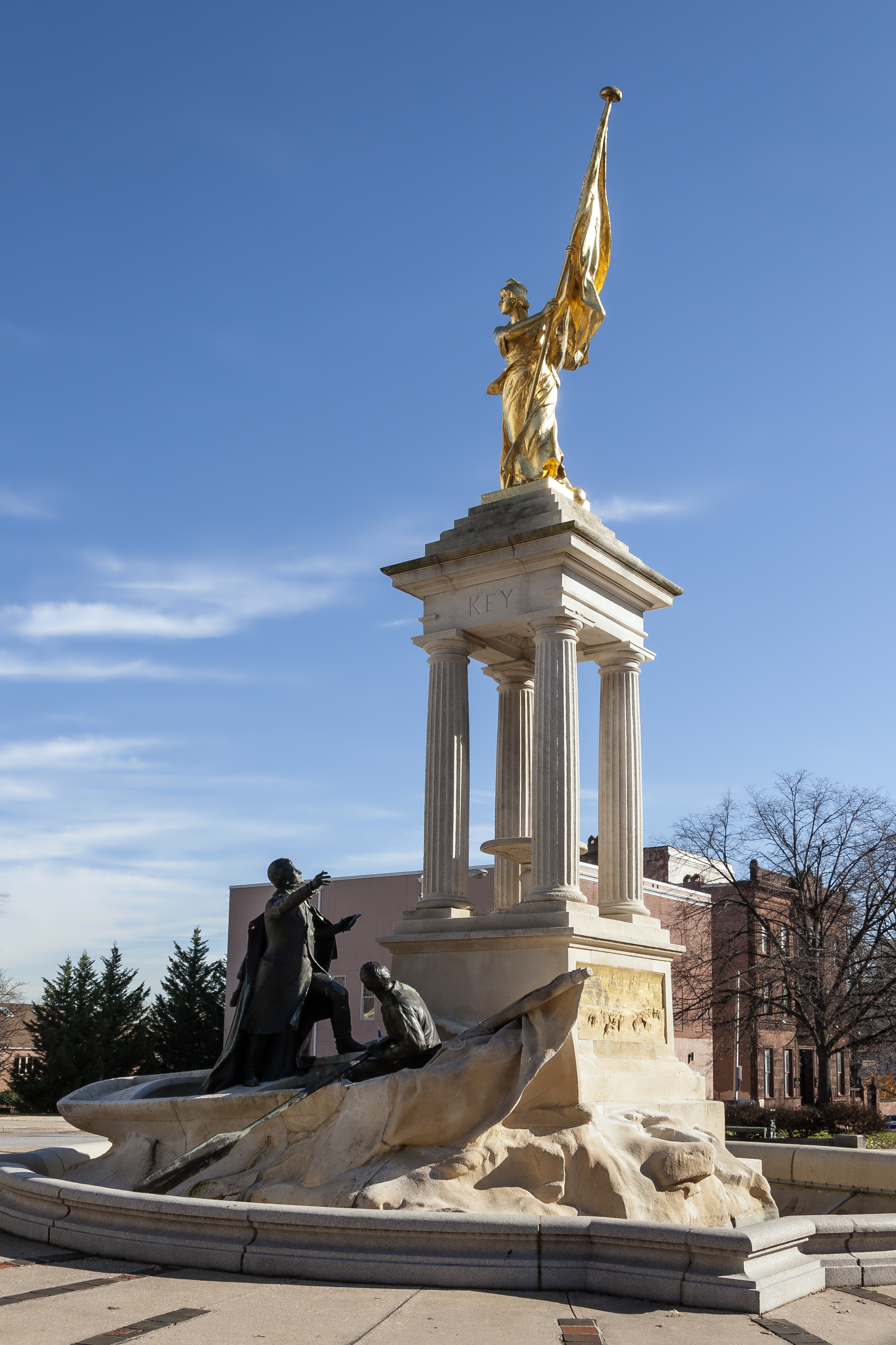
Francis Scott Key Monument in Baltimore, Maryland

- Francis Scott Key Monument in Baltimore, Maryland; French sculptor Antonin Mercié was commissioned after $25,000 was given for the work. It was erected in the city in 1911.
- Two bridges were named in Key's honor:
  - The first is between the Rosslyn section of Arlington County, Virginia, and Georgetown in Washington, D.C., where Key had lived. The home, which was dismantled in 1947 as part of construction of the Whitehurst Freeway, was located on M Street NW, in the area between the Key Bridge and the intersection of M Street and Whitehurst Freeway, as is illustrated on a sign in nearby Francis Scott Key park.
  - The other bridge was part of the Baltimore Beltway crossing the outer harbor of Baltimore, and was located at the approximate point where the British anchored to shell Fort McHenry. It stood until March 26, 2024, when it was destroyed by a cargo ship.
- St. John's College, Annapolis, from which Key graduated in 1796, has an auditorium named in his honor.
- Francis Scott Key was inducted into the Songwriters Hall of Fame in 1970.
- He is buried at Mount Olivet Cemetery in Frederick, the same resting place as that of Thomas Johnson, the first governor of Maryland, and friend Barbara Fritchie, who allegedly waved the American flag out of her home in defiance of Stonewall Jackson's march through the city during the Civil War.
- Francis Scott Key Hall at the University of Maryland, College Park is named in his honor. The George Washington University also has a residence hall in Key's honor at the corner of 20th and F Streets.
- Francis Scott Key High School in rural Carroll County, Maryland.
- Francis Scott Key Middle School in Houston, Texas
- Francis Scott Key Middle School in Silver Spring, Maryland
- Francis Scott Key Elementary School (several, including California, Maryland, Virginia, Washington, D.C.); Francis Scott Key School in Philadelphia.
- Francis Scott Key Mall in Frederick, Frederick County, Maryland.
- The Frederick Keys minor league baseball team – a Baltimore affiliate – is named after Key.
- The World War II Liberty ship SS Francis Scott Key was named in his honor.
- The US Navy named a submarine in his honor, the USS Francis Scott Key (SSBN-657).
- A monument to Francis Scott Key was commissioned by San Francisco businessman James Lick, who donated some $60,000 for a sculpture of Key to be raised in Golden Gate Park. The nation's first memorial to Francis Scott Key, the travertine monument was executed by sculptor William W. Story in Rome in 1885–87. The city of San Francisco allocated some US$140,000 to renovate the Key monument, and repairs had been recently finished on the monument as of April 2020. The statue was toppled by protesters on June 19, 2020. It has been replaced by 350 black steel sculptures—each 4 feet (1.2 meters) high—that honor the first 350 Africans kidnapped and forced onto a slave ship headed across the Atlantic from Angola to Virginia in 1619. The sculptor is Dana King.

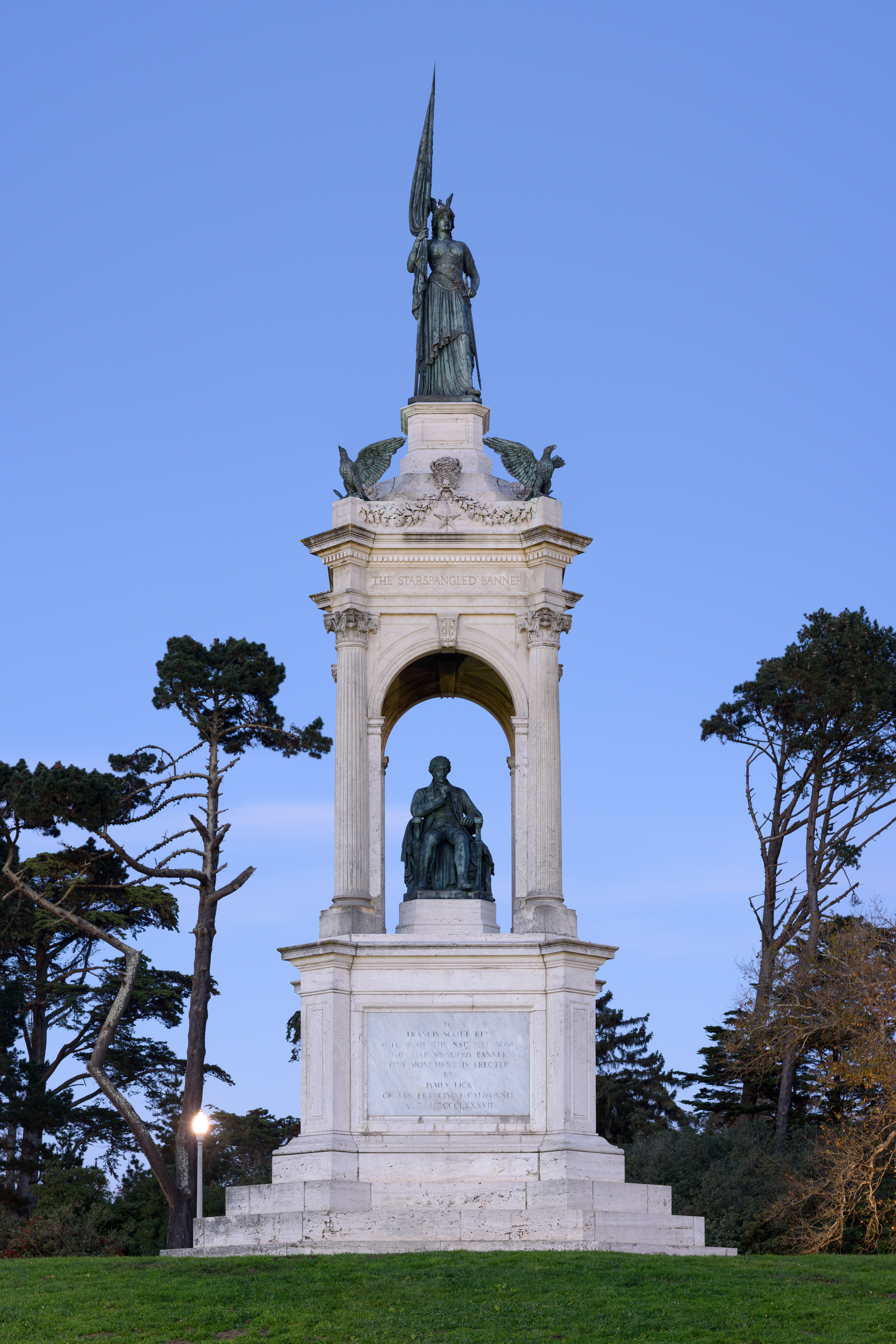
Francis Scott Key Monument as it stood in Golden Gate Park, San Francisco, until it was toppled in June 2020. The empty plinth is now surrounded by 350 black steel sculptures that honor the 350 Africans kidnapped from Angola into Virginia and transported across the Atlantic on slave ships.

== See also ==
- In God We Trust
- War of 1812
