= List of crossings of Rock Creek =

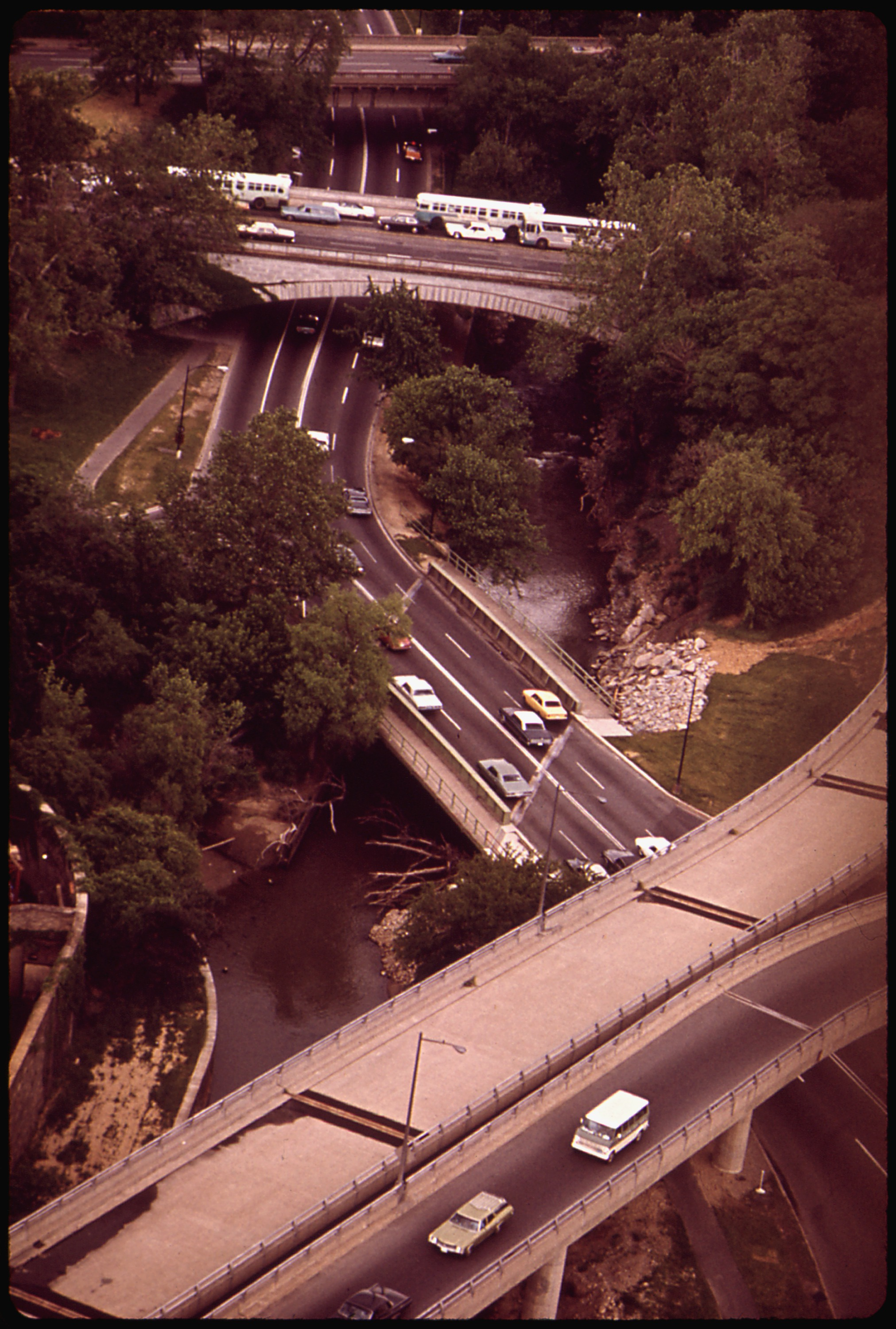
Several crossings of Rock Creek in 1973. From top to bottom: M Street Bridge, Pennsylvania Avenue Bridge, L Street Bridge, and an outlying span of K Street Bridge

Time-lapse video of a trip on the Rock Creek and Potomac Parkway and Beach Drive in 2015. Many crossings of Rock Creek are visible.

This is a list of crossings of Rock Creek. Rock Creek runs for 31 miles from its source in Montgomery County, Maryland, to its mouth at the Potomac River, of which the final nine miles lies in Washington, D.C. The entirety of Rock Creek downstream of the Maryland border is within Rock Creek Park (except for a small portion that runs through the National Zoo). The crossings built after Rock Creek Park was established in 1890 until World War II tended to be stone-faced bridges constructed to harmonize with the rustic surroundings, while postwar bridges were more utilitarian concrete and steel structures. Of the 35 crossings, 23 are covered by a Historic American Engineering Record (HAER), and two bridges—the gargantuan Taft Bridge and the bucolic Boulder Bridge—are on the National Register of Historic Places.

The first two crossings of Rock Creek were at the sites of the present M Street Bridge (1788) and K Street Bridge (1792), near the mouth of the creek. By the early twentieth century, when the initial plans for the Rock Creek and Potomac Parkway were being made, many of the bridges along its intended path in the lower portion of the valley were utilitarian steel-truss bridges at K Street, Pennsylvania Avenue, M Street, P Street, and Calvert Street, and there was a massive earthen embankment carrying Massachusetts Avenue across the valley, with a tunnel underneath for the creek to pass through. The sole crossing of any architectural value was the monumental 1907 Taft Bridge. Construction of the parkway entailed the replacement of all of these crossings except the Taft Bridge to align with the park's intended aesthetics, and the erecting of many more.

Farther upstream, at the time the upper portion of Rock Creek Park was established in 1890, the area was mainly undeveloped woodland containing small farms and mills accessed by private roads. Most crossings of the creek were fords rather than bridges, except for bridges at Military Road and Peirce Mill. Much of the initial development of the park was overseen by Lansing H. Beach, after whom Beach Drive is named.

Nearly all of the remaining portion of Rock Creek in Maryland is part of Rock Creek Stream Valley Park and Rock Creek Regional Park. This portion of the park was established in 1902. Rock Creek in Maryland flows through densely developed suburbs and is crossed by several major highways.

== District of Columbia ==
Image	Crossing	Carries	Built	Length	References and notes	Coordinates
	Thompson Boat Center Footbridge	pedestrians				38.900965°N 77.058274°W
	K Street Bridge	K Street and Whitehurst Freeway	1939–41 (lower level); 1947–49 (upper level)	497 feet	HAER DC-20. Earlier bridges on the site were built in 1792, 1869, and 1907.	38.902531°N 77.057725°W
	L Street Bridge	Rock Creek and Potomac Parkway	1981–83		HAER DC-697, pp. 92, 98, NPS Earlier bridges on the site were built ca. 1933 and ca. 1943.	38.903978°N 77.056590°W
	Pennsylvania Avenue Bridge	Pennsylvania Avenue	1915–16	276 feet	HAER DC-21. Portions of the earlier bridge, built 1858–60, are encased inside the current bridge	38°54′17″N 77°03′22″W
	M Street Bridge	M Street	1929–30	308 feet	HAER DC-37. Earlier bridges on the site were built in 1788, 1800, 1839, and 1871.	38°54′19″N 77°03′20″W
	P Street Bridge	P Street	1933–35		HAER DC-48. Earlier bridges on the site were built in 1855 and 1871.	38.909588°N 77.050279°W
	Bridge near P Street	Rock Creek and Potomac Parkway	1935–36	111 feet	HAER DC-11	38°54′36″N 77°03′01″W
	Dumbarton Bridge	Q Street	1915	265 feet	HAER DC-38	38°54′39″N 77°3′4″W
	Lyon's Mill Footbridge	pedestrians	1932–34	88 feet	HAER DC-35	38°54′45″N 77°03′15″W
	Charles C. Glover Memorial Bridge	Massachusetts Avenue	1939–41	420 feet	HAER DC-22. Earlier bridges on the site were built in 1888 and 1901.	38°55′04″N 77°03′30″W
	Saddle Club Footbridge	pedestrians	1934	110 feet	HAER DC-36	38°55′12″N 77°03′12″W
	Shoreham Hill Bridge	Rock Creek and Potomac Parkway	1938	220 feet	HAER DC-10	38°55′12″N 77°03′10″W
	Taft Bridge	Connecticut Avenue	1897–1907	901 feet	HAER DC-6. National Register of Historic Places. Site of former Woodley Lane Bridge (HAER DC-24), built 1889.	38°55′14″N 77°2′59″W
	Edgewater Stables Bridge	Edgewater Stables driveway				38.921752°N 77.049619°W
	Duke Ellington Bridge	Calvert Street	1933–1935	825 feet	HAER DC-23. Earlier bridge on the site was built in 1891.	38°55′24″N 77°02′54″W
	South Portal Bridge	Beach Drive	1966		HAER DC-55, p. 110	38.924006°N 77.048661°W
	Jewett Street Bridge	Jewett Street			Internal to National Zoological Park grounds	38.927979°N 77.048876°W
	Old Harvard Street Bridge	National Zoo Drive	1900–1901	148 feet	HAER DC-26. Earlier bridge on the site was built in 1892.	38°55′39″N 77°02′41″W
	New Harvard Street Bridge	Harvard Street	1965		HAER DC-53	38°55′41″N 77°02′40″W
	Klingle Ford Bridge	Klingle Road			HAER DC-55, p. 35	38.933254°N 77.050464°W
	Porter Street Bridge	Porter Street				38.934189°N 77.049005°W
	Bluffs Footbridge	pedestrians	1934	90 feet	HAER DC-33	38°56′12″N 77°02′52″W
	Footbridge near Jusserand Memorial	pedestrians				38.938361°N 77.051966°W
	Peirce Mill Bridge	Tilden Street	1872; additions in 1895 and 1921	178 feet	HAER DC-28. Earlier bridge on the site was built in the 1860s. Near Peirce Mill.	38°56′23″N 77°03′06″W
	Blagden Avenue Bridge	Beach Drive	1956	107 feet	HAER DC-55, p. 10	38.943836°N 77.049606°W
	Boulder Bridge	Beach Drive	1901–02	130 feet	HAER DC-12. National Register of Historic Places	38°56′54″N 77°02′42″W
	Rapids Footbridge	pedestrians	1934	110 feet	HAER DC-14	38°57′12″N 77°02′37″W
	Joyce Road Bridge	Joyce Road	1929	54 feet	HAER DC-18. Earlier bridges on the site were built in 1862 and 1905. Also called Old Military Road Bridge.	38°57′37″N 77°02′32″W
	Military Road Bridge	Military Road	1955?		HAER DC-55, p. 146	38.961357°N 77.043426°W
	Milkhouse Ford	Milkhouse Ford Road (abandoned)	1904	74 feet	HAER DC-25. The only ford remaining in the park	38°57′53″N 77°02′51″W
	Milkhouse Ford Bridge	Beach Drive	1956		HAER DC-55, p. 12 Earlier bridge on the site was built in 1926.	38°57′55″N 77°02′51″W
	Rolling Meadow Footbridge	pedestrians	1934	94 feet	HAER DC-31	38°58′13″N 77°02′41″W
	Sherrill Drive Bridge	Sherrill Drive	1962	79 feet	HAER DC-55, p. 14, 76 Earlier bridge on the site was built in 1924.	
	Riley Springs Footbridge	pedestrians	1934–35	120 feet	HAER DC-32	38°58′41″N 77°02′36″W
	Kalmia Bridge	West Beach Drive	1958	68 feet	HAER DC-55, p. 13	38.983978°N 77.042868°W
	Boundary Footbridge	pedestrians	1934–35	127 feet	HAER DC-34	38°59′13″N 77°03′08″W

== Maryland ==
Image	Crossing	Location	Notes	Coordinates
	Rock Creek Trail	Chevy Chase and Silver Spring		38.9865°N 77.0569°W
	Rock Creek Trail	Chevy Chase and Silver Spring		38.9865°N 77.0581°W
	Rock Creek Trail	Chevy Chase and Silver Spring		38.9860°N 77.0609°W
	Meadowbrook Park footbridge	Chevy Chase and Silver Spring		38.9866°N 77.0623°W
	East–West Highway	Chevy Chase and Silver Spring		38.9929°N 77.0621°W
	Purple Line; Georgetown Branch Trail	Chevy Chase and Silver Spring	Under construction; previous bridge demolished	38.9978°N 77.0626°W
	Rock Creek Trail	Chevy Chase and Silver Spring	Built in 2007	39.0006°N 77.0620°W
	footbridge to Ireland Trail	Chevy Chase and Silver Spring		39.0087°N 77.0623°W
	Jones Mill Road; Rock Creek Trail	Chevy Chase and Silver Spring		39.0107°N 77.0630°W
	Capital Beltway	Chevy Chase and Silver Spring/South Kensington		39.0115°N 77.0639°W
	Chevy Chase Lake & Kensington Railway (defunct)	Chevy Chase and South Kensington		39.0084°N 77.0736°W
	Kensington Parkway	Chevy Chase and South Kensington		39.0084°N 77.0736°W
	Connecticut Avenue	Chevy Chase/Bethesda and South Kensington		39.0069°N 77.0793°W
	Cedar Lane	Bethesda and South Kensington		39.0069°N 77.0793°W
	Beach Drive	Bethesda and South Kensington		39.0207°N 77.1000°W
	Beach Drive	North Bethesda and South Kensington		39.0267°N 77.0919°W
	Knowles Avenue	North Bethesda and South Kensington		39.0317°N 77.0873°W
	CSX Metropolitan Subdivision	North Bethesda and South Kensington/North Kensington		39.0329°N 77.0851°W
	Garrett Park Road	North Bethesda and Wheaton		39.0411°N 77.0893°W
	footbridge to Macon Road	North Bethesda and Wheaton		39.0487°N 77.0905°W
	Randolph Road	North Bethesda and Wheaton		39.0536°N 77.0911°W
	Rock Creek Trail	North Bethesda and Wheaton		39.0570°N 77.0933°W
	Parklawn Community Garden driveway Rock Creek Trail	North Bethesda and Rockville		39.0635°N 77.0994°W
	Parklawn Cemetery driveway	North Bethesda and Rockville		39.0650°N 77.1032°W
	Twinbrook Connector Trail	North Bethesda and Rockville		39.0842°N 77.1103°W
	Veirs Mill Road	North Bethesda and Rockville		39.0717°N 77.1092°W
	footbridge to Linthicum Street	Rockville and Aspen Hill		
	Baltimore Road	Aspen Hill		39.0901°N 77.1152°W
	Norbeck Road	Rockville and Aspen Hill		39.0940°N 77.1177°W
	Rock Creek Trail	Aspen Hill		39.0995°N 77.1185°W
	Rock Creek Trail	Aspen Hill and Derwood		39.1021°N 77.1211°W
	Avery Road	Aspen Hill and Derwood		39.1017°N 77.1248°W
	Southlawn Lane	Redland		39.1061°N 77.1252°W
	Lake Needwood Dam; Westside Trail	Redland		39.1141°N 77.1297°W
	Needwood Road	Redland		39.1276°N 77.1298°W
	Intercounty Connector	Redland		39.1358°N 77.1294°W
	Upper Rock Creek Trail	Redland		
	Muncaster Mill Road	Redland		39.1358°N 77.1294°W
	Muncaster Road	between Laytonsville and Redland		39.1542°N 77.1319°W
	Rock Creek Park Road	between Laytonsville and Redland		39.1606°N 77.1310°W
	Upper Rock Creek Trail	between Laytonsville and Redland		
	Fieldcrest Road	between Laytonsville and Redland		39.1847°N 77.1398°W
	Laytonsville Golf Course fairway	between Laytonsville and Redland	culvert under fairway	
	Laytonsville Golf Course fairway	between Laytonsville and Redland	culvert under fairway	
	Laytonsville Golf Course dam	between Laytonsville and Redland		
	Laytonsville Golf Course driveway	between Laytonsville and Redland		
	Dorsey Road	between Laytonsville and Redland		
