= List of bridges documented by the Historic American Engineering Record in Washington, D.C. =

This is a list of bridges documented by the Historic American Engineering Record in Washington, D.C.

== Bridges ==
Survey No.	Name (as assigned by HAER)	Status	Type	Built	Documented	Carries	Crosses	Coordinates
DC-4	Potomac Aqueduct	Ruin	Queen post truss	1843	1983	Chesapeake and Ohio Canal	Potomac River	38°54′15″N 77°04′14″W
DC-6	Connecticut Avenue Bridge	Extant	Reinforced concrete open-spandrel arch	1907	1987	Connecticut Avenue, NW	Rock Creek and Beach Drive, NW	38°55′14″N 77°02′59″W
DC-7	Arlington Memorial Bridge	Extant	Reinforced concrete closed-spandrel arch	1932	1988		Potomac River and George Washington Memorial Parkway northbound	38°53′14″N 77°03′20″W
DC-7-B	Arlington Memorial Bridge, Boundary Channel Extension	Extant	Reinforced concrete closed-spandrel arch	1932	1988	Memorial Avenue	Boundary Channel and George Washington Memorial Parkway southbound	38°53′07″N 77°03′41″W
DC-9-A	Tidal Reservoir, Inlet Bridge	Extant	Reinforced concrete closed-spandrel arch	1909	1988	Ohio Drive, SW	Tidal Basin inlet	38°52′49″N 77°02′25″W
DC-9-B	Tidal Reservoir, Outlet	Extant	Stone arch	1889	1988	Pedestrian way adjacent to Ohio Drive, SW	Tidal Basin outlet	38°52′58″N 77°01′58″W
DC-10	Shoreham Hill Bridge	Extant	Reinforced concrete closed-spandrel arch	1938	1988	Rock Creek and Potomac Parkway	Rock Creek	38°55′12″N 77°03′10″W
DC-11	Rock Creek and Potomac Parkway Bridge near P Street	Extant	Reinforced concrete closed-spandrel arch	1936	1988	Rock Creek and Potomac Parkway	Rock Creek	38°54′36″N 77°03′01″W
DC-12	Boulder Bridge	Extant	Reinforced concrete closed-spandrel arch	1902	1988	Beach Drive, NW	Rock Creek	38°56′54″N 77°02′42″W
DC-13	Ross Drive Bridge	Extant	Reinforced concrete open-spandrel arch	1907	1988	Ross Drive, NW	Tributary of Rock Creek	38°57′12″N 77°02′45″W
DC-14	Rapids Footbridge	Extant	Reinforced concrete open-spandrel arch	1934	1988	Trail in Rock Creek Park	Rock Creek	38°57′12″N 77°02′37″W
DC-15	Pinehurst Bridge	Extant	Reinforced concrete open-spandrel arch	1911	1988	Beach Drive, NW	Pinehurst Branch	38.971364°N 77.043774°W
DC-16	South Waterside Drive Overpass	Extant	Reinforced concrete T-beam	1933	1988	Waterside Drive, NW, southbound	Rock Creek and Potomac Parkway northbound	38°54′49″N 77°03′18″W
DC-17	Grant Road Bridge	Extant	Stone arch	1898	1988	Grant Road, NW	Broad Branch	38°54′49″N 77°03′18″W
DC-18	Old Military Road Bridge	Extant	Steel rolled multi-beam	1929	1988	Joyce Road, NW	Rock Creek	38°57′37″N 77°02′32″W
DC-19	Boundary Channel Bridge	Extant	Reinforced concrete girder	1932	1988	George Washington Memorial Parkway	Boundary Channel	38°52′31″N 77°02′49″W
DC-20	K Street Bridge	Extant	Reinforced concrete rigid frame	1941	1992	K Street, NW	Rock Creek and Rock Creek and Potomac Parkway	38°54′09″N 77°03′28″W
DC-21	Pennsylvania Avenue Bridge	Extant	Reinforced concrete closed-spandrel arch	1916	1992	Pennsylvania Avenue, NW	Rock Creek and Rock Creek and Potomac Parkway	38°54′17″N 77°03′22″W
DC-22	Massachusetts Avenue Bridge	Extant	Reinforced concrete closed-spandrel arch	1939	1992	Massachusetts Avenue, NW	Rock Creek and Rock Creek and Potomac Parkway	38°55′04″N 77°03′30″W
DC-23	Calvert Street Bridge, (renamed Duke Ellington Bridge, 1974)	Extant	Reinforced concrete closed-spandrel arch	1935	1992	Calvert Street, NW	Rock Creek and Beach Drive, NW	38°55′24″N 77°02′54″W
DC-24	Woodley Lane Bridge Abutment	Ruin		1889	1992	Belmont Road, NW	Rock Creek	38°55′17″N 77°02′59″W
DC-25	Milkhouse Ford	Bypassed	Ford	1904	1992	Trail in Rock Creek Park	Rock Creek	38°57′53″N 77°02′51″W
DC-26	Old Harvard Street Bridge	Extant	Reinforced concrete closed-spandrel arch	1901	1992	National Zoo Drive, NW	Rock Creek	38°55′39″N 77°02′41″W
DC-27	Connecticut Avenue Bridge, Spanning Klingle Valley	Extant	Steel arch	1932	1992	Connecticut Avenue, NW	Klingle Valley	38°55′56″N 77°03′24″W
DC-28	Pierce Mill Bridge	Extant	Steel built-up girder	1895	1992	Tilden Street, NW	Rock Creek	38°56′23″N 77°03′06″W
DC-29	Sixteenth Street Bridge	Extant	Reinforced concrete closed-spandrel arch	1910	1992	16th Street, NW	Piney Branch and Piney Branch Parkway, NW	38°56′18″N 77°02′11″W
DC-30	Morrow Drive Bridge	Extant	Reinforced concrete closed-spandrel arch	1911	1992	Morrow Drive, NW	Tributary of Rock Creek	38°57′34″N 77°02′19″W
DC-31	Rolling Meadow Footbridge	Extant	Reinforced concrete closed-spandrel arch	1934	1992	Trail in Rock Creek Park	Rock Creek	38°58′13″N 77°02′41″W
DC-32	Riley Springs Footbridge	Extant	Reinforced concrete closed-spandrel arch	1935	1992	Trail in Rock Creek Park	Rock Creek	38°58′41″N 77°02′36″W
DC-33	Bluffs Footbridge	Extant	Reinforced concrete closed-spandrel arch	1934	1992	Trail in Rock Creek Park	Rock Creek	38°56′12″N 77°02′52″W
DC-34	Boundary Footbridge	Extant	Reinforced concrete closed-spandrel arch	1935	1992	Valley Trail	Rock Creek	38°59′13″N 77°03′08″W
DC-35	Lyon's Mill Footbridge	Extant	Reinforced concrete closed-spandrel arch	1934	1992	Trail in Rock Creek Park	Rock Creek	38°54′45″N 77°03′15″W
DC-36	Saddle Club Footbridge	Extant	Reinforced concrete closed-spandrel arch	1934	1992	Trail in Rock Creek Park	Rock Creek	38°55′12″N 77°03′12″W
DC-37	M Street Bridge	Extant	Steel built-up girder	1930	1992	M Street, NW	Rock Creek and Rock Creek and Potomac Parkway	38°54′19″N 77°03′20″W
DC-38	Q Street Bridge	Extant	Reinforced concrete closed-spandrel arch	1915	1992	Q Street, NW	Rock Creek and Rock Creek and Potomac Parkway	38°54′39″N 77°03′04″W
DC-39	Little River Inlet Bridge	Extant	Steel built-up girder	1963	1994	George Washington Memorial Parkway	Boundary Channel	38°53′24″N 77°03′51″W
DC-40	U.S. Route 50 Overpass, Westbound	Extant	Steel built-up girder	1946	1994	Ramp from George Washington Memorial Parkway northbound to US 50 (Arlington Boulevard) westbound	Boundary Channel and George Washington Memorial Parkway southbound	38°53′20″N 77°03′51″W
DC-41	Washington Boulevard Overpass	Extant	Reinforced concrete rigid frame	1942	1993	Washington Boulevard northbound	Ramp from Washington Boulevard southbound to George Washington Memorial Parkway southbound	38°52′57″N 77°03′27″W
DC-42	Washington Boulevard Bridge	Extant	Reinforced concrete closed-spandrel arch	1943	1994	SR 27 (Washington Boulevard)	Boundary Channel and George Washington Memorial Parkway southbound	38°52′50″N 77°03′26″W
DC-43	New Boundary Channel Bridge	Extant	Reinforced concrete box girder	1965	1994	George Washington Memorial Parkway southbound	Boundary Channel	38°52′51″N 77°03′32″W
DC-44	Mount Vernon Bike Trail Bridge	Extant	Steel built-up girder	1987	1994	Mount Vernon Trail	Boundary Channel	38°53′24″N 77°03′50″W
DC-48	P Street Bridge	Extant	Reinforced concrete closed-spandrel arch	1935	1992	P Street, NW	Rock Creek and Rock Creek and Potomac Parkway	38°54′35″N 77°03′01″W
DC-50	Long Bridge	Extant	Swing span	1903	1992	CSX Transportation and Amtrak	Potomac River	38°52′29″N 77°02′26″W
DC-51	Francis Scott Key Bridge	Extant	Reinforced concrete open-spandrel arch	1923	1992	US 29	Potomac River	38°54′08″N 77°04′13″W
DC-53	New Harvard Street Bridge	Extant	Reinforced concrete box girder	1965	1992	Harvard Street, NW	Rock Creek	38°55′41″N 77°02′40″W
