= List of bridges on the National Register of Historic Places in Washington =

List of bridges on the National Register of Historic Places in Washington may refer to:

- List of bridges on the National Register of Historic Places in Washington (state)
- List of bridges on the National Register of Historic Places in Washington, D.C.
