= List of bridges documented by the Historic American Engineering Record in Washington =

List of bridges documented by the Historic American Engineering Record in Washington may refer to:

- List of bridges documented by the Historic American Engineering Record in Washington (state)
- List of bridges documented by the Historic American Engineering Record in Washington, D.C.
