= Pennsylvania Avenue Bridge =

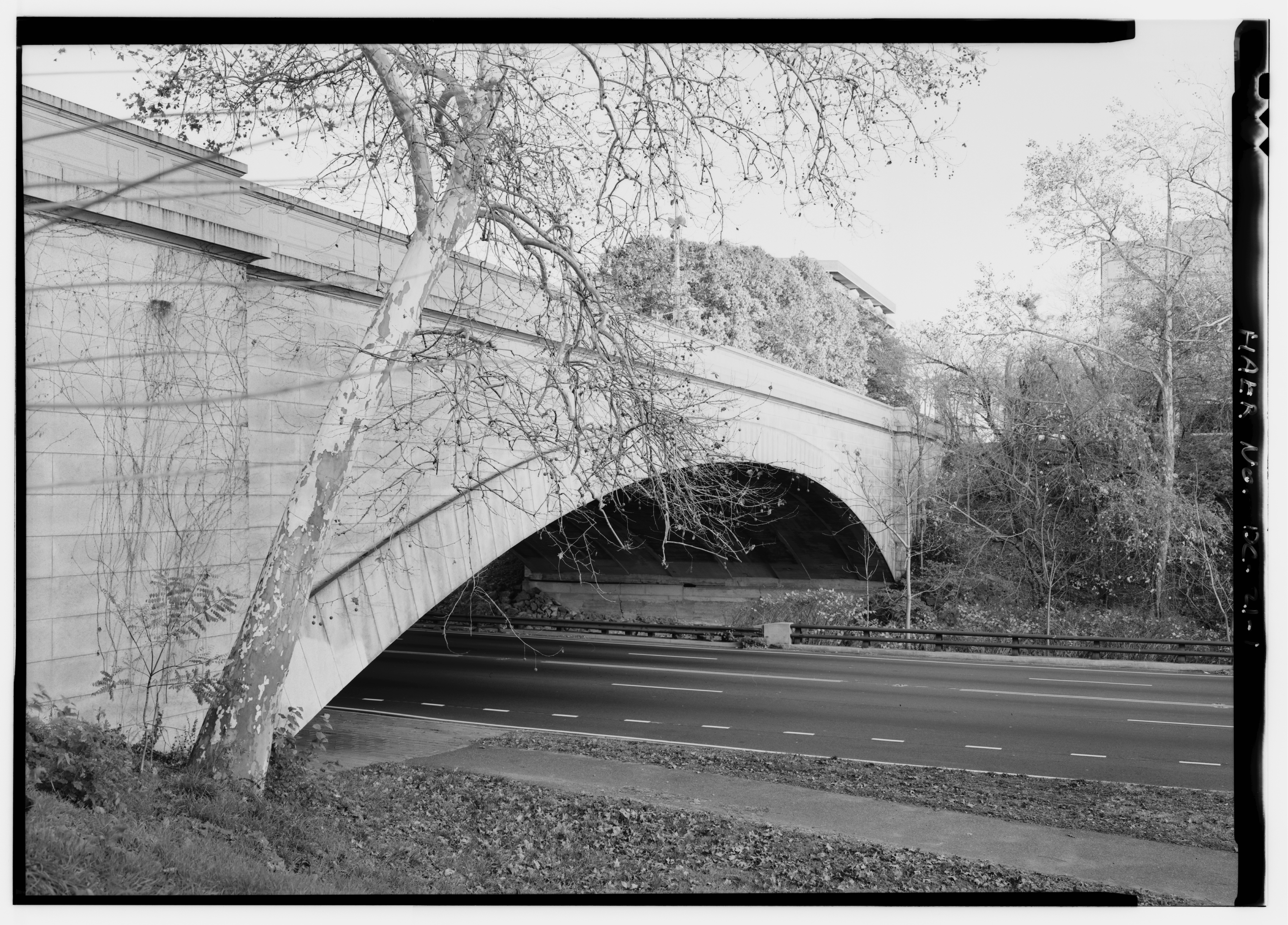
- Coordinates: 38°54′17″N 77°03′22″W
- Carries: Pennsylvania Avenue
- Crosses: Rock Creek
- Locale: Washington, D.C.
- Other name: Meigs Bridge
- Owner: District of Columbia Department of Transportation

Characteristics
- Design: Deck arch
- Material: 1860: Cast iron 1916: Concrete
- Total length: 1860: 200 feet (61 m); 1916: 276 feet (84 m)
- Width: 1916: 73 feet (22 m)
- Height: 1916: 40 feet (12 m)

History
- Designer: Montgomery C. Meigs (1860); District of Columbia Government (1916)
- Fabrication by: Phoenix Iron Co., Philadelphia (1860)
- Construction start: 1858; 1913
- Construction end: 1860; 1916
- Opened: 1860

Location
- Interactive map of Pennsylvania Avenue Bridge

The Pennsylvania Avenue Bridge conveys Pennsylvania Avenue across Rock Creek and the adjoining Rock Creek and Potomac Parkway, between the neighborhoods of Georgetown and Foggy Bottom in Northwest Washington, D.C. Pennsylvania Avenue terminates at M Street immediately west of the bridge.

== Original configuration ==
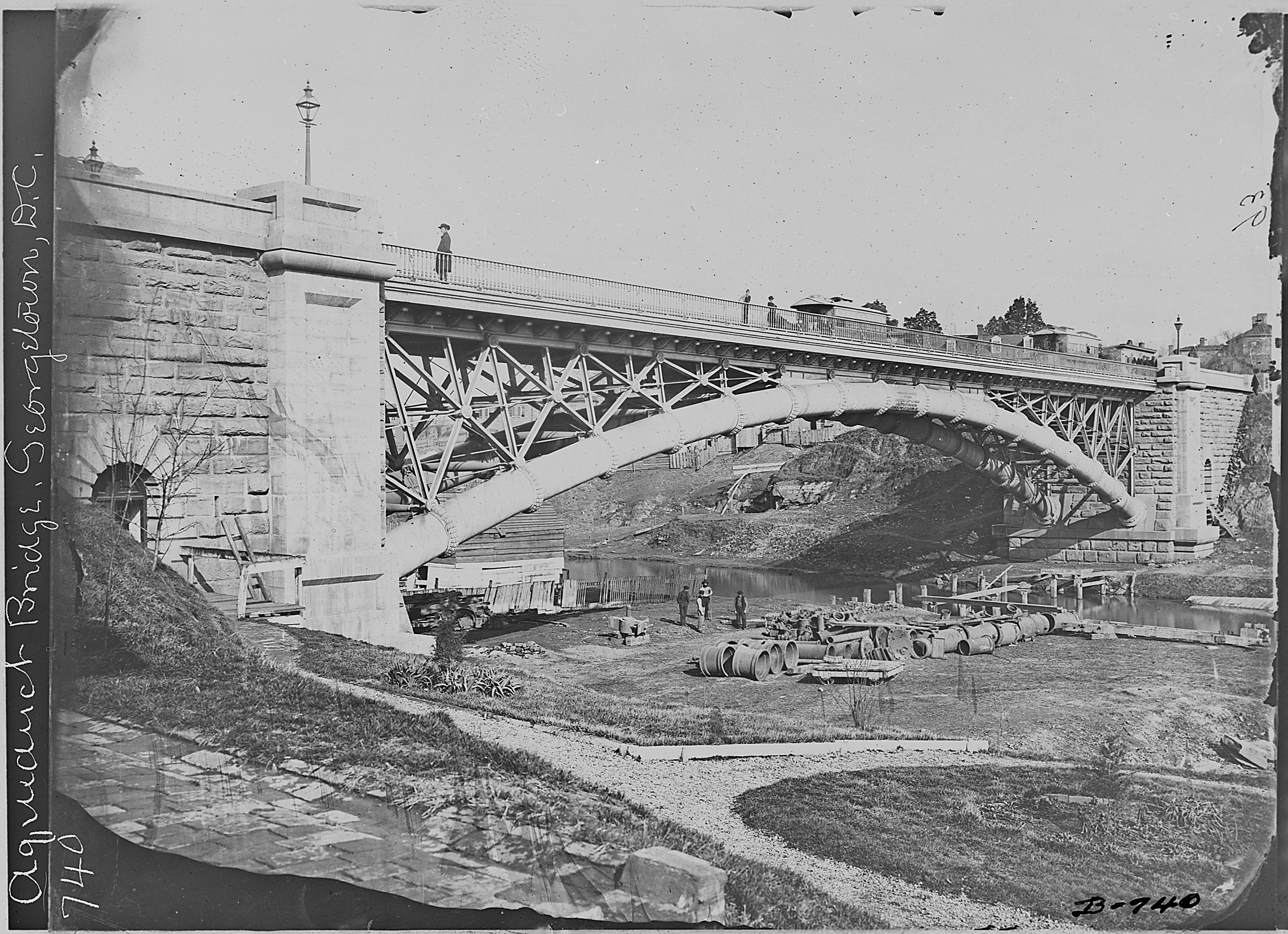
The original appearance of the bridge in the 1860s

The original bridge at this site was constructed of large cast iron pipes by the Army Corps of Engineers from 1858 to 1860. Montgomery C. Meigs designed the bridge and supervised its construction as part of the original construction of the Washington Aqueduct. It was officially named the Meigs Bridge after it was completed, although name that never caught on and it was often called other names such as the Tubular Bridge.

At its construction, it was the only bridge made entirely of cast iron of substantial size in the United States. It was initially intended to be solely an aqueduct bridge carrying water mains connected to the Georgetown Reservoir, but the onset of the Civil War necessitated making it a vehicular crossing as well. The level of traffic was such that the wooden deck had to be replaced every three years.

The bridge used an innovative design in which the 48-inch water pipes themselves formed the load-bearing arches of the bridge supporting the roadway. A water pressure engine in the west abutment supplied water to a reservoir at the current site of the Georgetown branch of the D. C. Public Library to feed the significant part of the City of Georgetown that was too high to be directly fed by the main Washington Aqueduct. A horse-drawn streetcar line crossed the bridge from 1863 to 1872, when it was rerouted over the nearby M Street Bridge.

== Current configuration ==
In 1913, the D.C. Board of Commissioners opted to build an expanded arch bridge around the existing bridge rather than construct a completely new steel-girder bridge for cost reasons. The United States Commission of Fine Arts, the agency tasked with reviewing architectural projects in the capital, opposed the plan on aesthetic grounds, saying that the arch design would clash with the existing Q Street Bridge upstream, but their recommendations were ignored.

The expanded bridge was built of reinforced concrete with a smooth granite facing. The abutments and water mains of the original bridge are encased inside the expanded bridge, which still transports water to this day, although they no longer support the bridge's load. The new bridge was significantly wider than the original; increasing from 17 feet to 73 feet.

By 2015, the bridge was considered structurally deficient, with a 15-month rehabilitation planned for summer.

== See also ==
- List of bridges documented by the Historic American Engineering Record in Washington, D.C.
