= Streets and highways of Washington, D.C. =

Surface transportation infrastructure of Washington, D.C., US

- Standard markers for highways in Washington, D.C.

Highway names
- Interstates: Interstate X (I-X)
- US Highways: U.S. Route X (US X)
- State: District of Columbia Route X (DC X)

System links
- Streets and Highways of Washington, DC; Interstate; US; DC; State-Named Streets

The streets and highways of Washington, D.C., form the core of the surface transportation infrastructure in Washington, D.C., the federal capital of the United States. Given that it is a planned city, the city's streets follow a distinctive layout and addressing scheme. There are 1,500 miles (2,400 km) of public roads in the city, of which 1,392 miles (2,240 km) are owned and maintained by city government.

== City layout ==
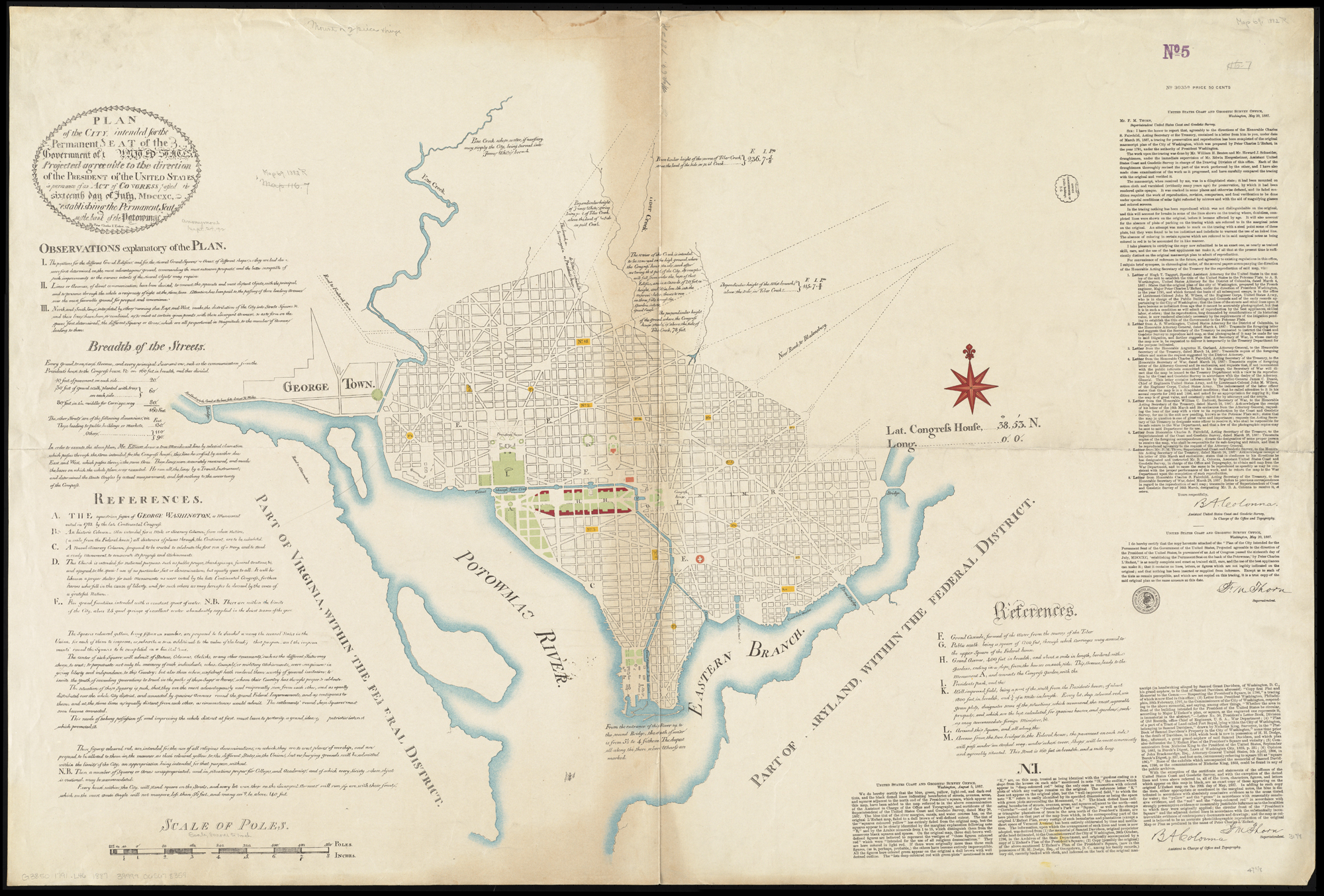
Facsimile of manuscript of Peter Charles L'Enfant's 1791 plan for the federal capital city (United States Coast and Geodetic Survey, 1887).

L'Enfant's plan for Washington, D.C., as revised by Andrew Ellicott in 1792

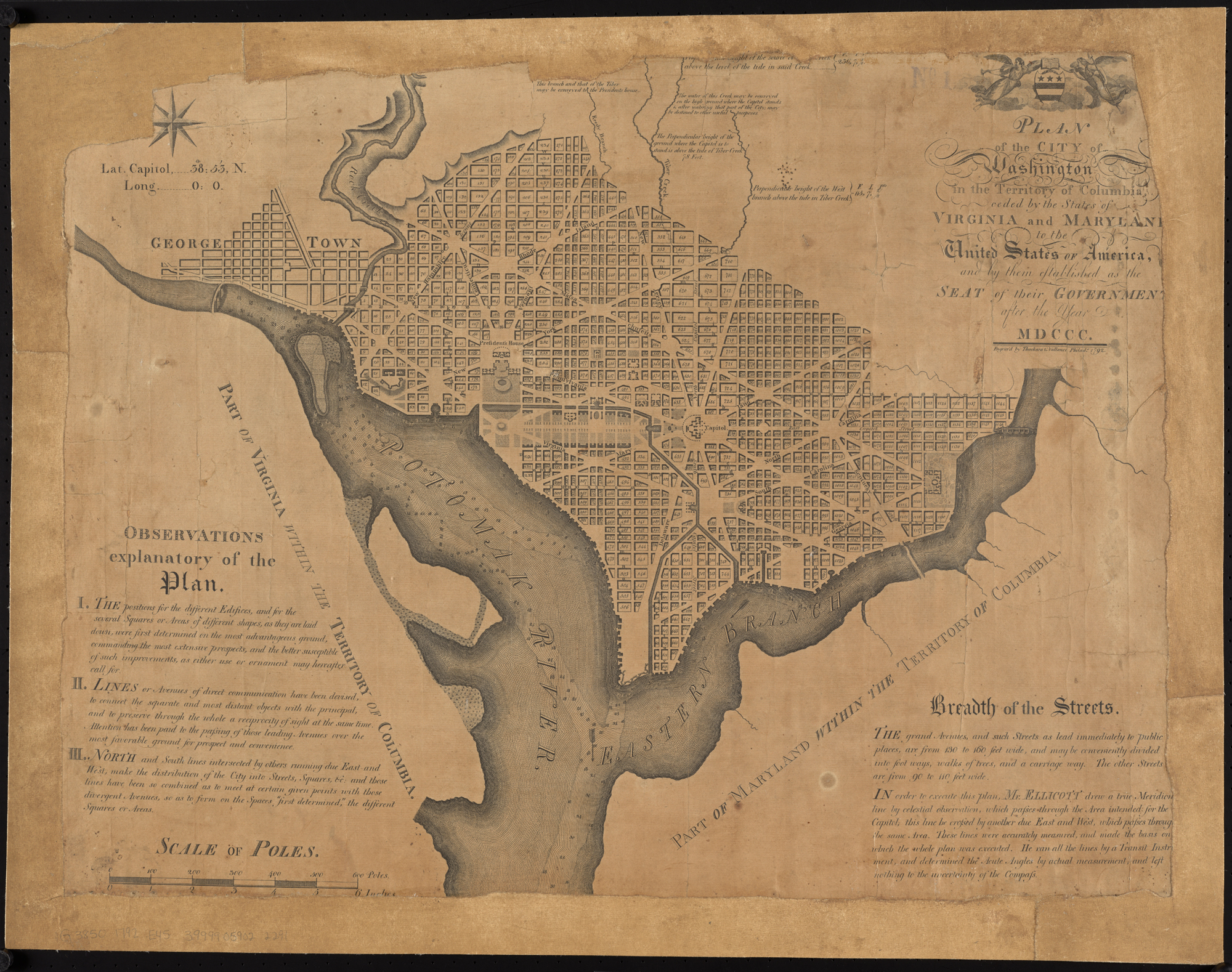
Thackara & Vallance's 1792 print of Ellicott's "Plan of the City of Washington in the Territory of Columbia", showing street names, lot numbers, depths of the Potoma River and legends

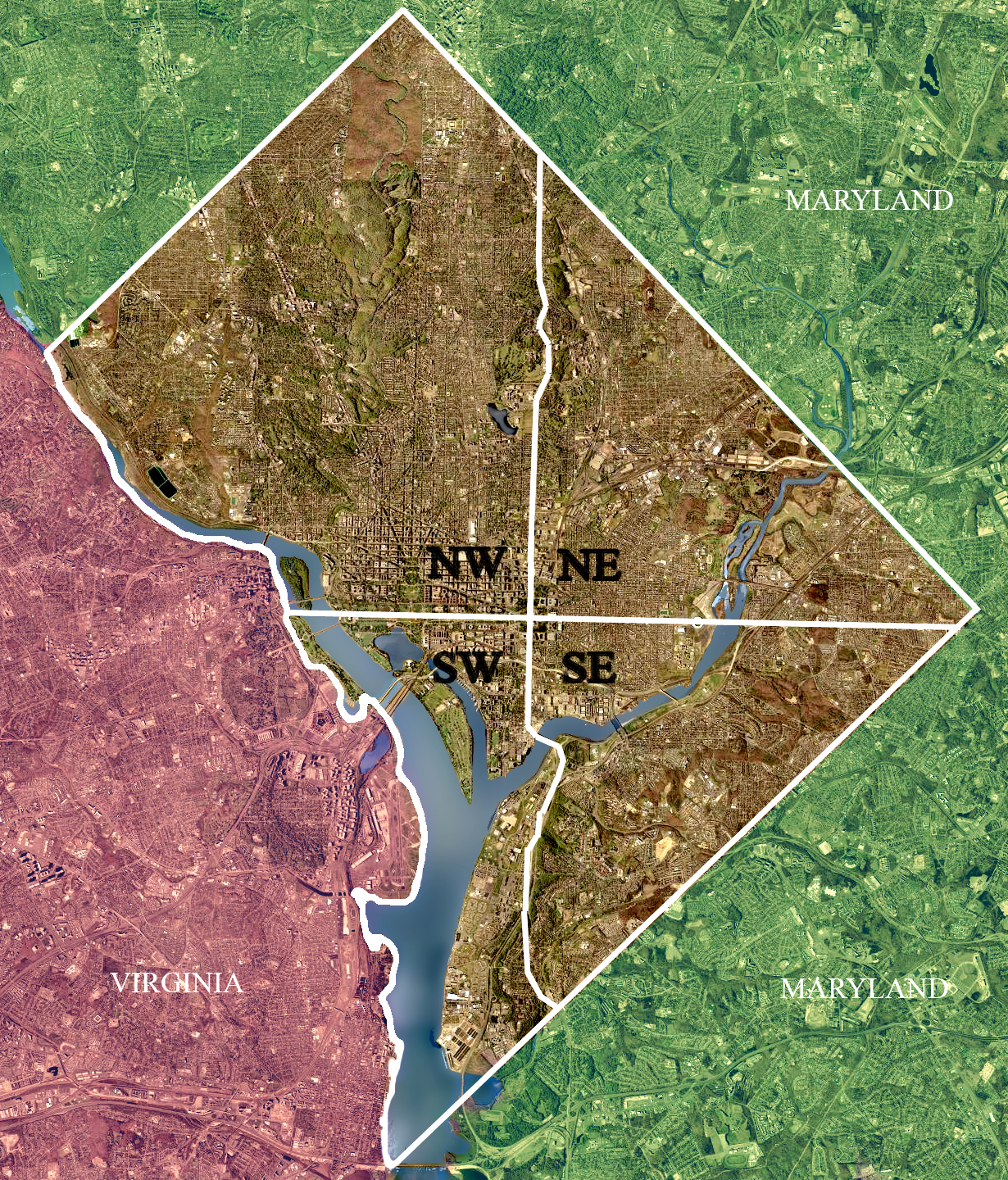
Washington, D.C., is divided into four quadrants: Northwest, Northeast, Southeast, and Southwest. The axes bounding the quadrants radiate from the United States Capitol building.

The District of Columbia was created to serve as the permanent national capital in 1790. Within the district, a new capital city was founded in 1791 to the east of an existing settlement at Georgetown. The original street layout in the new City of Washington was designed by Pierre (Peter) Charles L'Enfant.

As a planned city, Washington was modeled in the Baroque style and incorporated avenues radiating out from rectangles, providing room for open space and landscaping. At L'Enfant's request, Thomas Jefferson provided plans of cities such as Amsterdam, Paris, Frankfurt, Karlsruhe and Milan, which he had brought back from Europe in 1788. The twelve radiating avenues, the distribution of the central space (originally L-shaped) and other details were inspired by the Spanish royal city of Aranjuez, whose urban plans were widely distributed and where the 1779 treaty was signed. His design also envisioned a garden-lined "grand avenue" approximately 1 mile (1.6 km) in length and 400 feet (120 m) wide in the area that is now the National Mall. The City of Washington was bounded to the north by Boundary Street, now Florida Avenue, at the base of the escarpment of the Atlantic Seaboard Fall Line, to the southeast by the Anacostia River, to the southwest by the Potomac River and to the west by Rock Creek.

President Washington dismissed L'Enfant in March 1792 due to L'Enfant's insistence on micromanaging the city's planning, which had resulted in conflicts with the three commissioners appointed by Washington to supervise the capital's construction. Andrew Ellicott, who had worked with L'Enfant surveying the city, was then commissioned to complete the plans. Though Ellicott made revisions to the original plans, including changes to some street patterns, L'Enfant is still credited with the overall design of the city.

The district is divided into four quadrants of unequal area: Northwest (NW), Northeast (NE), Southeast (SE), and Southwest (SW). The axes bounding the quadrants radiate from the U.S. Capitol building. All road names include the quadrant abbreviation to indicate their location, and house numbers are assigned based on the approximate number of blocks away from the Capitol. In most of the city, the streets are set out in a grid pattern with east–west streets named with letters (e.g., C Street SW) and north–south streets with numbers (e.g., 4th Street NW).

Most portions of the north–south axis and the eastern portion of the east–west axis are marked by streets with the common name of Capitol Street: North Capitol Street, South Capitol Street, and East Capitol Street. Since an axis runs down the middle of those streets, the addresses on each side are necessarily in different quadrants. The western portion of the east–west axis runs down the Mall. Two avenues, Constitution Avenue and Independence Avenue, line each side of the Mall.

Many of the diagonal streets and avenues in Washington are named after states. Some of these streets are particularly noteworthy, such as Pennsylvania Avenue, which connects the White House with the U.S. Capitol, and Massachusetts Avenue, a section of which is informally known as Embassy Row from the number of foreign embassies located along the street.

=== Unused letters for lettered street names ===
There is no J Street in any quadrant. The reason for this is that, until the mid-19th century, the letters "I" and "J" were indistinguishable when written. Following that same idea, "I" Street is often written as "Eye" Street, to distinguish it from the letter "L" and the numeral "1". Similarly, "Q" Street is often written as "Que", "Cue", or "Queue". Urban legend had said that J Street was omitted deliberately by L'Enfant due to a dispute with John Jay, the first Chief Justice of the United States Supreme Court; however, this was later proven to be a myth. There is a street named Jay Street in the NE quadrant (in the Deanwood neighborhood), but it does not belong to the series of lettered streets.

In addition to skipping the letter J, the last three letters of the alphabet, X, Y, and Z are not used as street names in any of the quadrants. The letter B is also skipped. North of the Mall, B Street was renamed in 1931 to Constitution Avenue, and south of the Mall, B Street was renamed in 1934 to Independence Avenue. In the areas north and south of the Mall, the lettered streets begin with the letter C, as the Mall itself fills up the portion of the city that would be A Street.

== Expansion of the street-name system ==
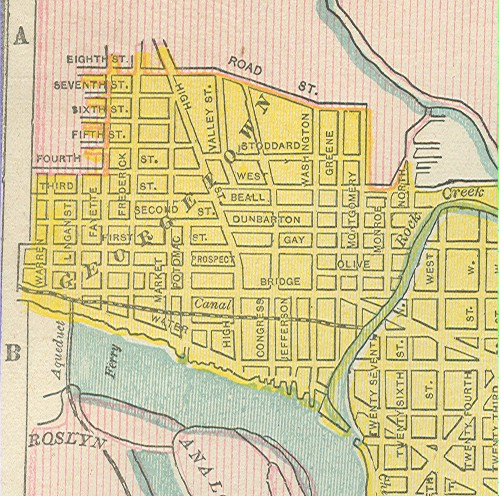
Map of Georgetown from 1899, showing old street names

During most of the 19th century, each municipality within the federal district maintained its own separate government and street system. With the passage of the Organic Act of 1871, Congress created a new government for the entire federal district. This act combined the City of Washington, Georgetown, and the unincorporated area then known as Washington County into a single municipality for the whole District of Columbia.

Through much of the 19th century, developers of land outside of the center city tended to build streets wherever they liked. An 1887 report of the commissioners of the District of Columbia, the three-member panel that governed the district, said that many of these streets "go nowhere and connect with nothing." The Commissioners said that "If the configuration and architecture of a city has a moral influence upon its residents, the rectification of the irreclaimable obliquity of the... streets is manifestly desirable for more than physical reasons."

In 1888, Congress passed a law requiring that future subdivisions built outside of the City of Washington and Georgetown must have streets that conform to the general plan of the City of Washington. However, the law allowed existing streets to remain, contrary to the wishes of the commissioners of the District of Columbia.

In 1893, Congress passed a law mandating that existing streets must be changed or moved in order to be in conformity with the district's street plan. Some property owners were upset that their private property would need to be seized without compensation in order to move streets in conformance with the street plan. The Supreme Court agreed, striking down the law as unconstitutional. In 1893, Congress mandated a new system of highways within the district that conformed to the City of Washington's street plan but left existing streets in place. A separate act of Congress in 1895 required that the street names in Georgetown be changed to conform to the street naming system used in the City of Washington. However, the old street names were shown on maps as late as 1899.

The commissioners of the District of Columbia mandated a new system of naming streets in 1901. Streets running north and south would continue to be numbered. North of Florida Avenue, streets running east and west would be named after famous Americans. The streets would be given one-syllable names in alphabetical order. Alphabetical names after the letter W would be two-syllable names starting with A (e.g., Adams St) ending with W (e.g., Webster St), and then three-syllable names. Selected names are common across the quadrants. Only in the Northwest Quadrant was a "fourth alphabet" necessary. This fourth alphabet uses botanical names without regard to the number of syllables: Aspen, Butternut, Cedar, etc. Verbena Street NW is the last in this series before the Maryland state line. South of the center city, a similar system would be used with streets named after famous Americans or prominent geographical locations. In 1905, the streets east of Rock Creek Park, north of Florida Avenue, and west of North Capitol Street were renamed in conformity with the single street-naming system. Eventually all street names in the District of Columbia were made to conform to a single street-naming system.

The boundaries of the District of Columbia with the State of Maryland are marked by Western Avenue, Eastern Avenue, and Southern Avenue.

== Address system ==
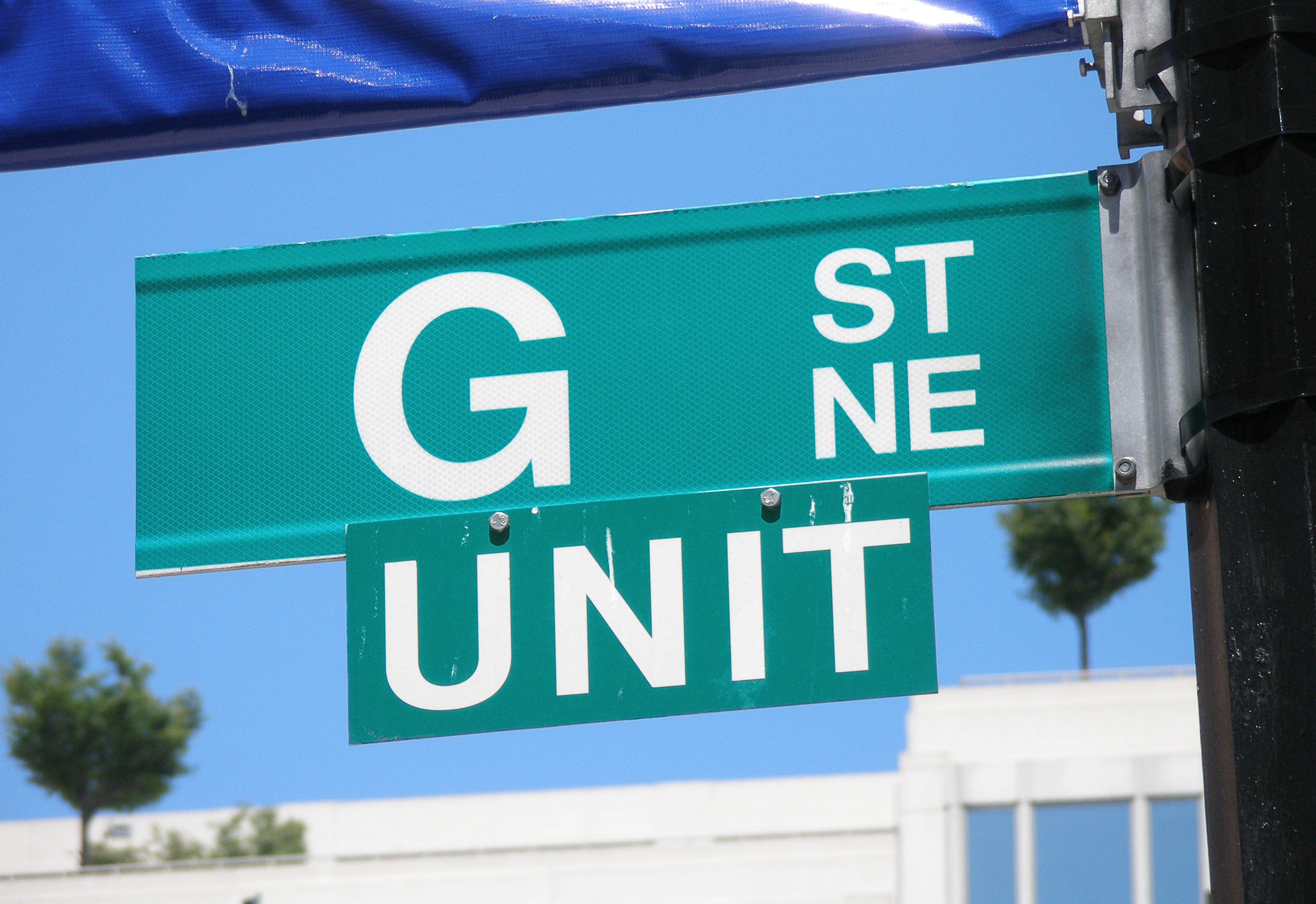
A street sign for the unit block of G Street Northeast, next to Union Station. Tourists sometimes see this sign as a reference to G-Unit.

The city's addressing system is best understood in terms of a Cartesian coordinate system with its origin at the Capitol. While the system may appear complex, once learned it allows one to pinpoint not only where one is but also where and how far one may need to travel. For example, one can readily infer from the address 633 A Street SE that the referenced location is southeast of the US Capitol, one block south of East Capitol Street, on the south side of A Street SE, between 6th and 7th Streets SE.

Another example is the White House, located at 1600 Pennsylvania Avenue NW: it is located at 16th Street NW (Lafayette Square) and Pennsylvania Avenue NW. This works both ways; an address at 514 19th St NW would be on 19th St west of the Capitol, and since E is the fifth letter of the alphabet, the 514 address would be between E and F Streets NW. Because J is omitted from the scheme, it is not counted in numbering. Thus, the 900 block is in between I and K Streets, and the 1000 block is in between K and L Streets (even though K is the 11th letter of the alphabet).

For the first block of a street as counted from the relevant axis (that is, with house numbers from 1 to 99), the city posts the word "unit" on a plaque below the street name sign and labels the first block the unit block. This practice differs from most American cities, which post a plaque bearing a zero or a one followed by an arrow. Subsequent blocks are marked in the conventional fashion as "100", "200", and so forth.

Address numbers also correspond with a particular side of the street, with odd numbers on the right as one faces in the direction of increasing numbers. This works out by quadrant as shown below:

| Quadrant | East–west streets | North–south streets |
|---|---|---|
| Northwest | Odd numbers on north side | Odd numbers on east side |
| Southwest | Odd numbers on north side | Odd numbers on west side |
| Southeast | Odd numbers on south side | Odd numbers on west side |
| Northeast | Odd numbers on south side | Odd numbers on east side |

== Major roads ==
A large system of freeways was planned in the district. Many, especially in the northern half, were canceled after freeway revolts. (Canceled freeways are shown in light blue.)

=== Interstate highways ===
Washington, D.C. metropolitan area road map

Interstate 495, also known as the "Capital Beltway", creates an artificial boundary for the inner suburbs of Washington and is the root of the phrase "inside the Beltway". Almost completely circling Washington, D.C., it crosses a tiny portion of the district at its southernmost point at the Woodrow Wilson Bridge. I-66 runs from the eastern edge of Georgetown, connects with the Beltway, and continues through Northern Virginia to I-81. I-295 comes up from the south starting at the eastern edge of the Woodrow Wilson Bridge on the Beltway and ending at the 11th Street Bridges, where it intersects with I-695 (the Southeast Freeway) to cross the Anacostia River into downtown. Just south of the U.S. Capitol Building, I-695 links up with I-395 (the Southwest Freeway), a major commuter route extending from New York Avenue to the Beltway and Interstate 95 in Springfield, Virginia. The Inner Loop was a proposed network of freeways in the city center; however, only portions of it were ever built. Today, the "inner loop" is most frequently used to describe the inside lanes of 495—that is, those that travel clockwise around Washington.

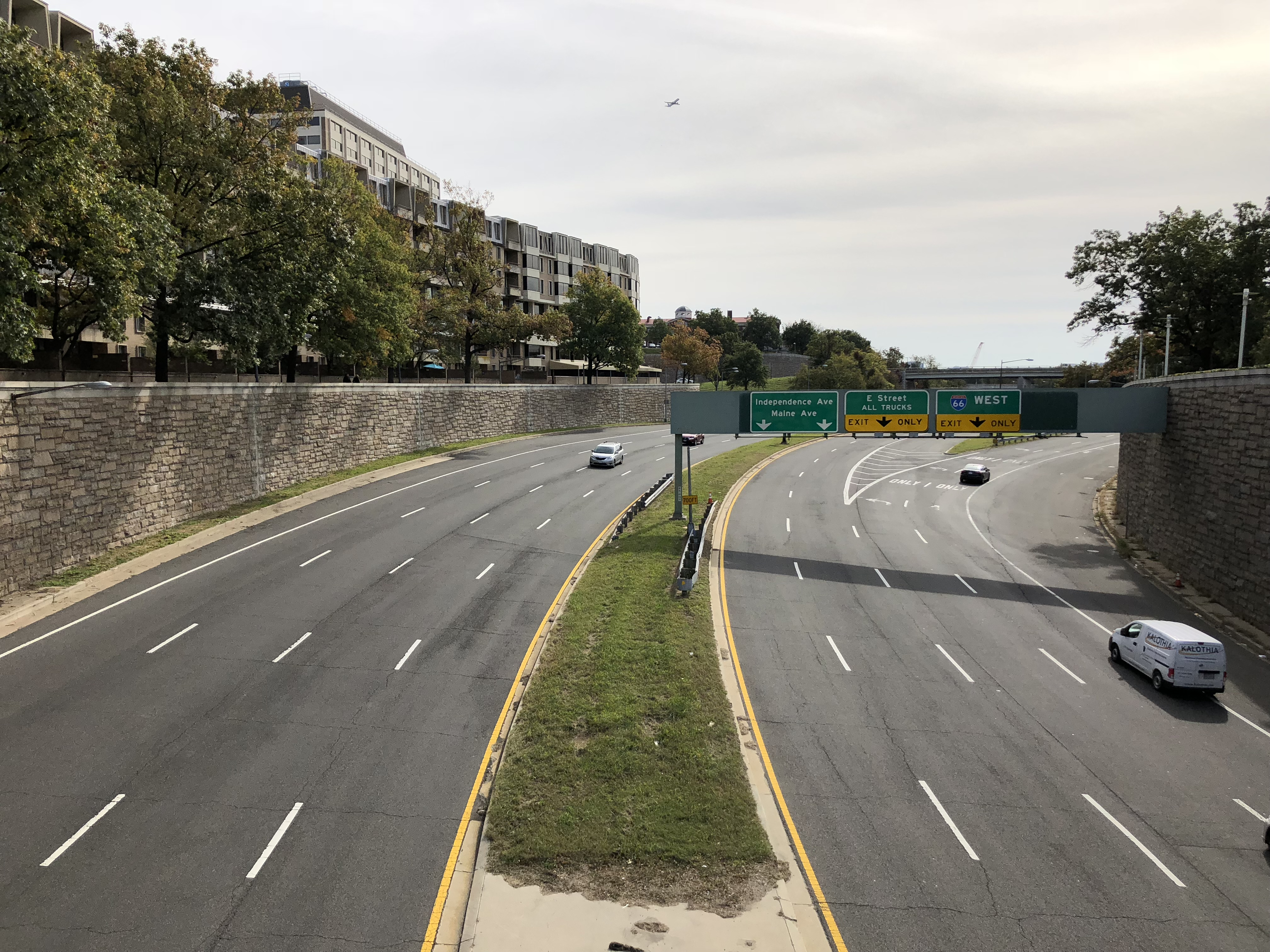
I-66 in Washington, D.C.

A convergence indexing based road traffic monitoring system was installed on Washington's highways in 2008.

=== Other expressways and parkways ===
The Anacostia Freeway (DC-295) continues in a northeasterly direction from the point where I-295 ends at its intersection with I-695 near the 11th Street Bridges on the south side of the Anacostia River and links with the Baltimore–Washington Parkway, which eventually becomes Maryland Route 295, via a short section of Maryland Route 201. The Suitland Parkway connects the city with the southeastern suburbs in Prince George's County, Maryland. The Whitehurst Freeway, an elevated freeway over K Street in Georgetown, allows US 29 traffic to bypass congested Georgetown between the Key Bridge and K Street downtown. The E Street Expressway connects I-66 with the city's Foggy Bottom area and the areas immediately to the west of the White House. The Rock Creek and Potomac Parkway provides access to downtown from the northern and western ends of the city.

=== City streets ===
Among the major roads in the city are MacArthur Boulevard NW, 14th Street NW, 16th Street NW, 18th Street NW, 7th Street NW, Connecticut Avenue NW, K Street NW, H Street NW, Wisconsin Avenue, M Street NW, H Street NE, Pennsylvania Avenue, Constitution Avenue, Independence Avenue, Massachusetts Avenue, U Street NW, South Dakota Ave NE, North Capitol Street, South Capitol Street, East Capitol Street, Georgia Avenue, Minnesota Avenue, Benning Road, Martin Luther King Jr. Avenue, New York Avenue, and Rhode Island Avenue.

While city streets generally do not have route numbers, U.S. Routes 1, 1 Alternate, 29, and 50 are routed predominantly or entirely over city surface streets.

== See also ==
- History of Washington, D.C.
- List of circles in Washington, D.C.
- List of state-named roadways in Washington, D.C.
- Architecture of Washington, D.C.
