= Ross Drive Bridge =

Historic bridge in Washington, D.C., United States

- Boulder Bridge and Ross Drive Bridge
- U.S. National Register of Historic Places
- U.S. Historic district – Contributing property
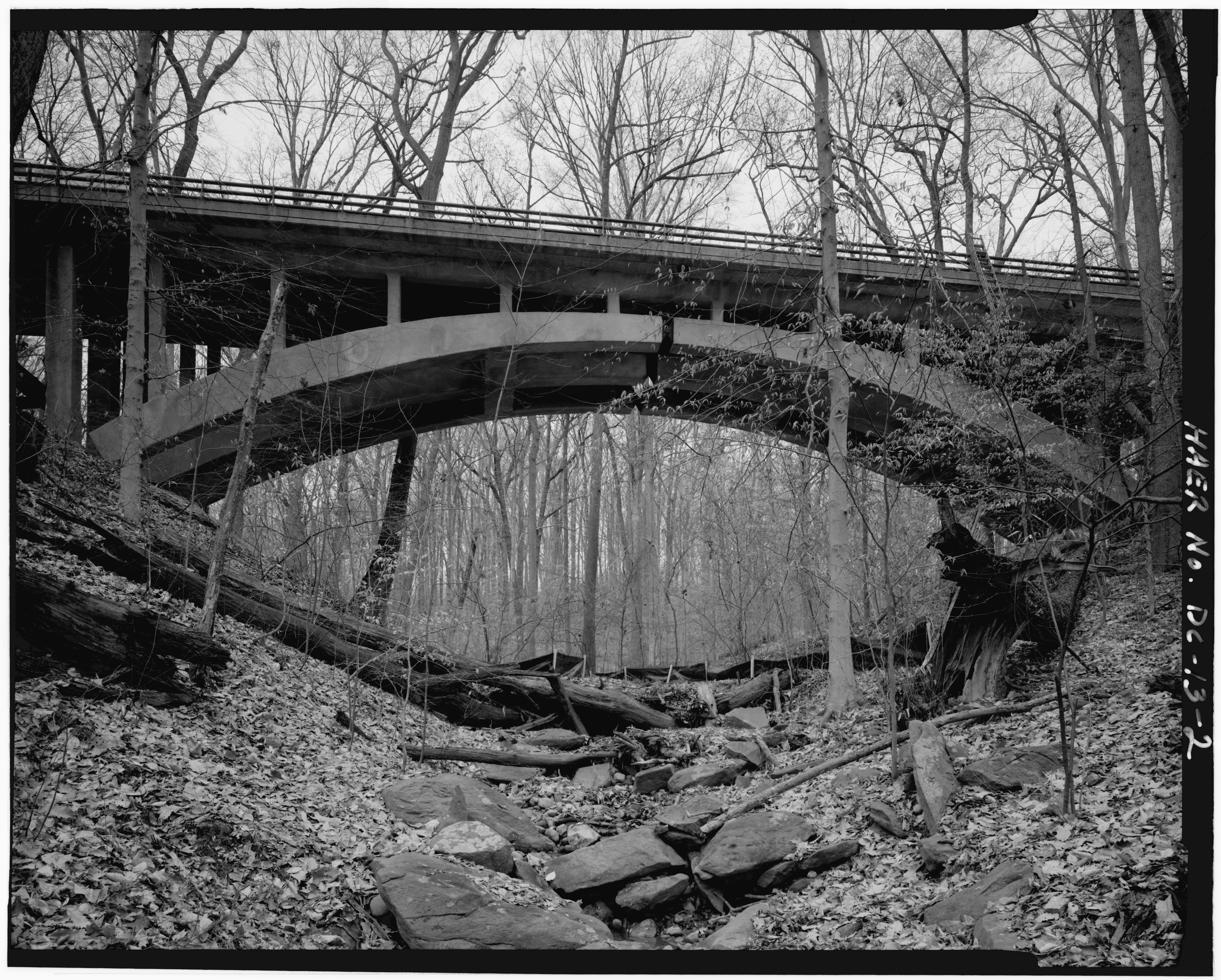
- Ross Drive Bridge

- Location within the District of Columbia Location within the United States
- Location: Rock Creek Park; Washington, D.C. United States
- Coordinates: 38.95352°N 77.045864°W
- Built: 1907
- Architect: W. J. Douglas; Army Corps of Engineers
- Architectural style: Melan style
- Part of: Rock Creek Park Historic District (ID91001524)
- NRHP reference No.: 80000348

Significant dates
- Added to NRHP: March 20, 1980
- Designated CP: October 23, 1991

The Ross Drive Bridge is a historic bridge located in the Washington, D.C. portion of Rock Creek Park, an urban national park listed on the National Register of Historic Places.

Ross Drive Bridge was originally constructed as a timber bridge in 1903 to carry Ross Drive over a tributary ravine of Rock Creek. The bridge was rebuilt in 1907 with a 168-foot span. It was designed and constructed by the United States Army Corps of Engineers.

Boulder Bridge and Ross Drive Bridge were added to the National Register of Historic Places on March 20, 1980. In addition, the bridges are contributing properties to the Rock Creek Park Historic District.

== See also ==
- List of bridges on the National Register of Historic Places in Washington, D.C.
- National Register of Historic Places listings in the District of Columbia
