= List of bridges on the National Register of Historic Places in Washington, D.C. =

This is a list of bridges on the National Register of Historic Places in Washington, D.C.

Name	Image	Built	Listed	Location	Type
Arlington Memorial Bridge		1926, 1932	April 4, 1980	38°53′12″N 77°3′39″W	Central bascule
Boulder Bridge and Ross Drive Bridge		1902, 1907	March 20, 1980	38°56′53″N 77°2′42″W	
Connecticut Avenue Bridge		1897, 1907, 1936	July 3, 2003	38°55′16″N 77°3′2″W	
Connecticut Avenue Bridge over Klingle Valley		1930, 1932	May 21, 2004	38°56′6″N 77°3′25″W	
Dumbarton Bridge		1912, 1915	July 16, 1973	38°54′38″N 77°3′5″W	
Francis Scott Key Bridge		1917, 1923, 1939	March 1, 1996	38°54′8″N 77°4′13″W	

== See also ==
- National Register of Historic Places listings in the District of Columbia
- Architecture of Washington, D.C.
