= Lyon's Mill Footbridge =

Bridge in Washington DC, United States

Coordinates: 38°54′45″N 77°03′15″W

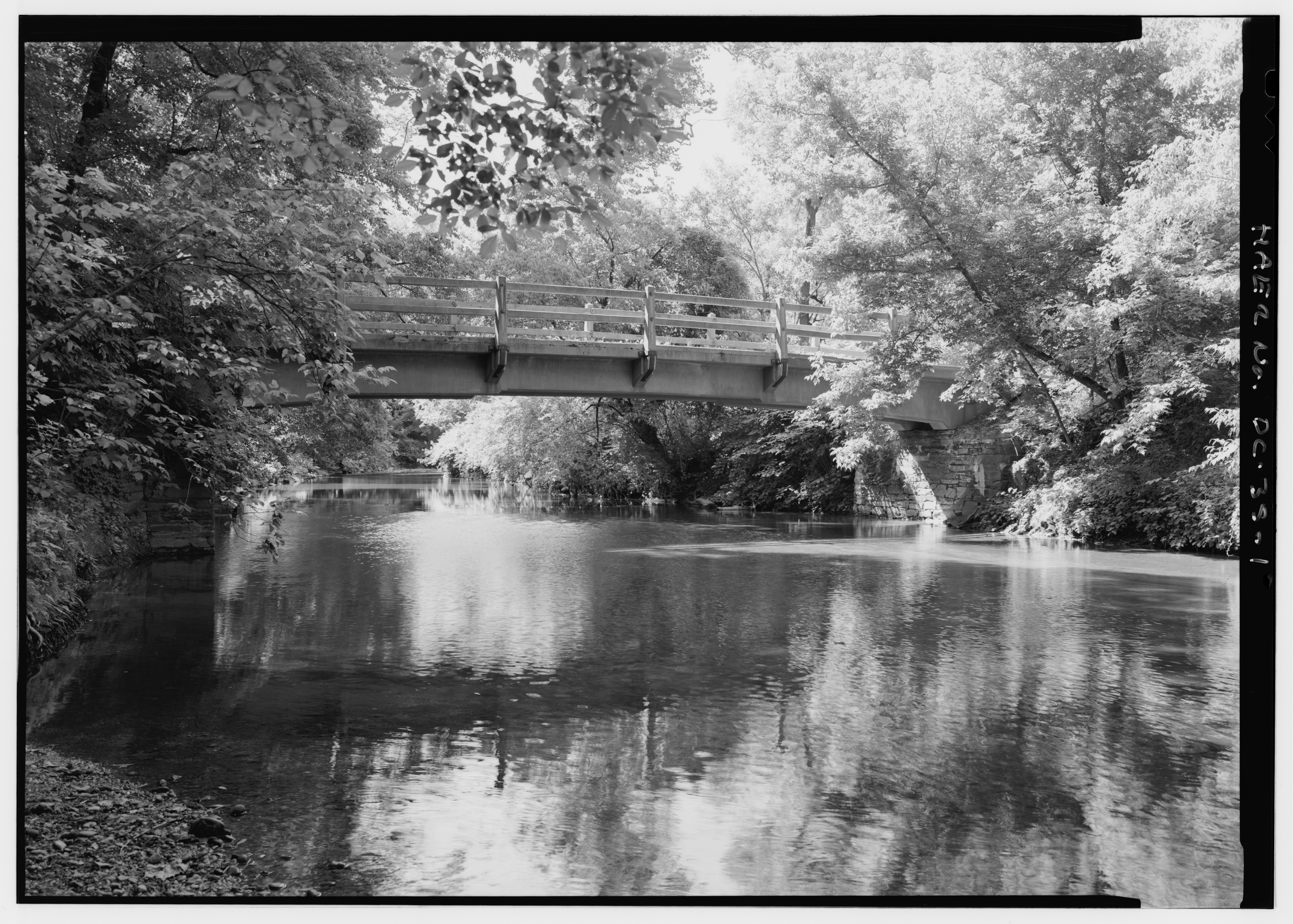
Lyon's Mill Footbridge in 1993

The 'Lyon's Mill Footbridge is a concrete footbridge across Rock Creek in Washington, DC. It was completed in 1934. The eastern abutment is a remnant of the original Lyon's Mill on the site.
