= K Street Bridge =

Complex of bridges in Washington, D.C.

Coordinates: 38.902531°N 77.057725°W

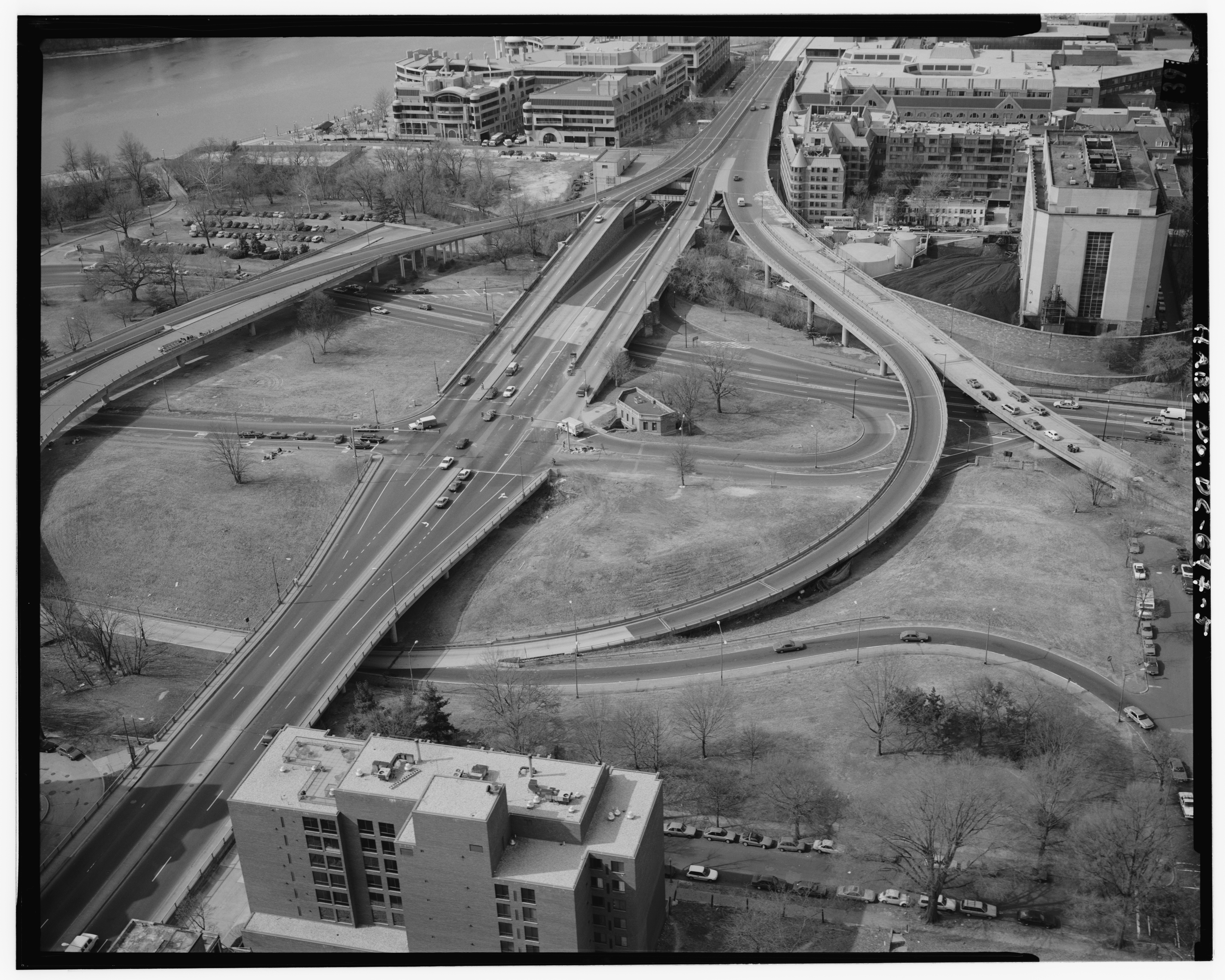
The K Street Bridge in 1993. The near parts of the circular ramps were intended to connect to the unbuilt North Leg of the Inner Loop Expressway and have since been demolished.

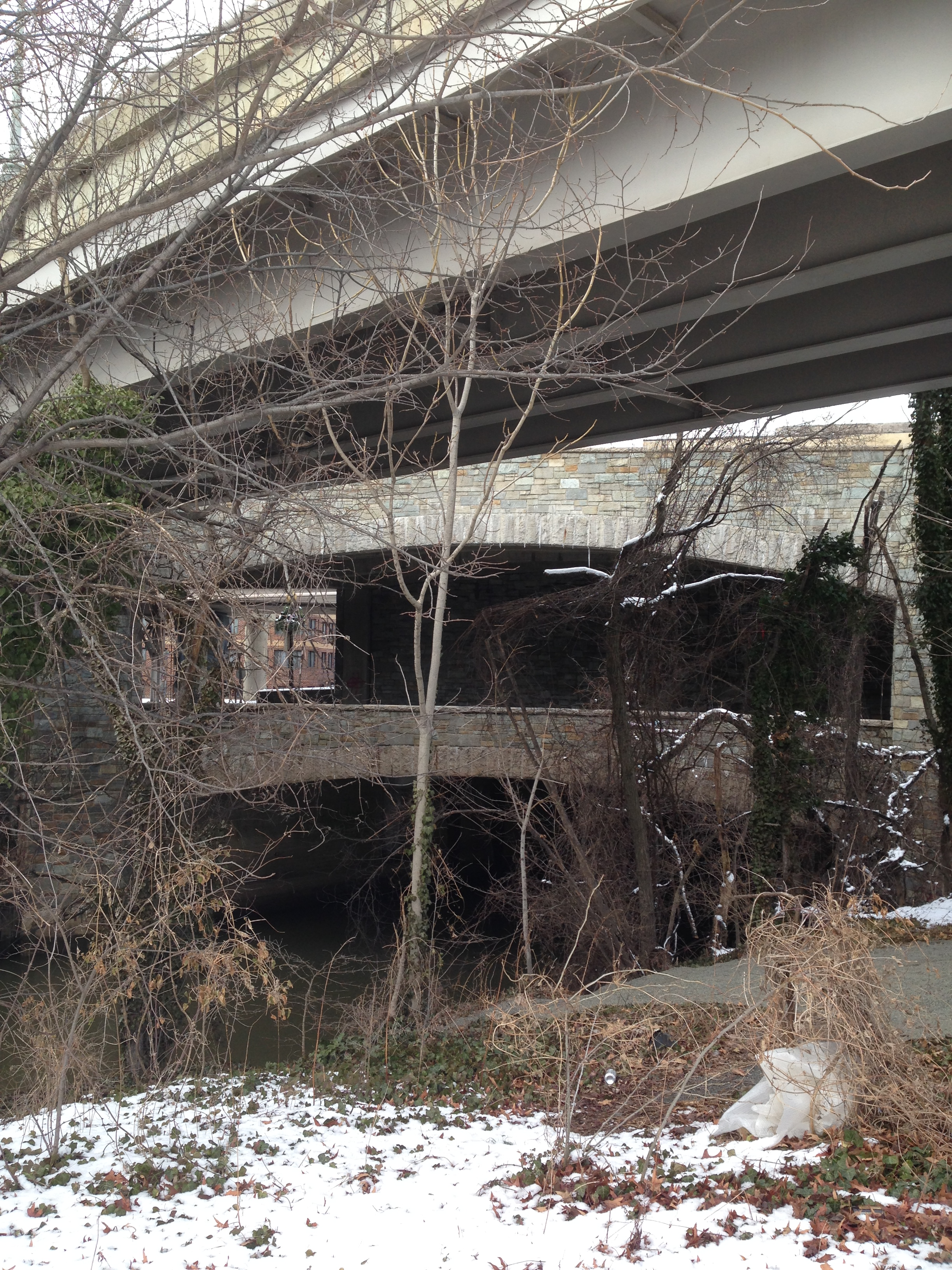
The span crossing Rock Creek in 2015. The three portions of the bridge built at different times are clearly distinguishable.

The K Street Bridge is a complex of bridges over Rock Creek and the Rock Creek and Potomac Parkway in Washington, D.C. The lower level of the bridge carries the surface street K Street, while the upper level carries the Whitehurst Freeway (U.S. Route 29) which terminates and merges into K Street immediately east of the bridge. The central bridge is flanked by two flyover ramps that connect to the nearby terminus of Interstate 66.

The first bridge on the site was a stone arch bridge constructed in 1792; it was only the second crossing of Rock Creek built, the first being at M Street. This bridge was found to be unstable and its center arch was demolished in 1795. In 1869, a wood bridge was constructed, and in 1907 it was replaced by a steel-plate girder bridge.

The completion of the Rock Creek and Potomac Parkway in 1936 increased traffic on the K Street Bridge, necessitating its replacement. The lower level of the current bridge was constructed between 1939 and 1941, and the upper level, connecting to the Whitehurst Freeway, was constructed from 1947 to 1949. The designers of the current K Street Bridge also designed the Charles C. Glover Memorial Bridge farther up the river. The bridge is built of concrete, faced with gneiss. The flanking ramps were constructed in the early 1960s. They initially contained unused branches intended to connect to the unbuilt North Leg of the Inner Loop Expressway. These ramps were demolished in the mid-1990s.

The bulk of the K Street Bridge, with its many ramps, was considered to be more of a visual barrier than the other bridges across Rock Creek. This was a result of transportation efficiency taking precedence over aesthetic concerns in this case, perhaps because at the time of its construction the surrounding neighborhoods were industrial or poor residential areas.

== Gallery ==
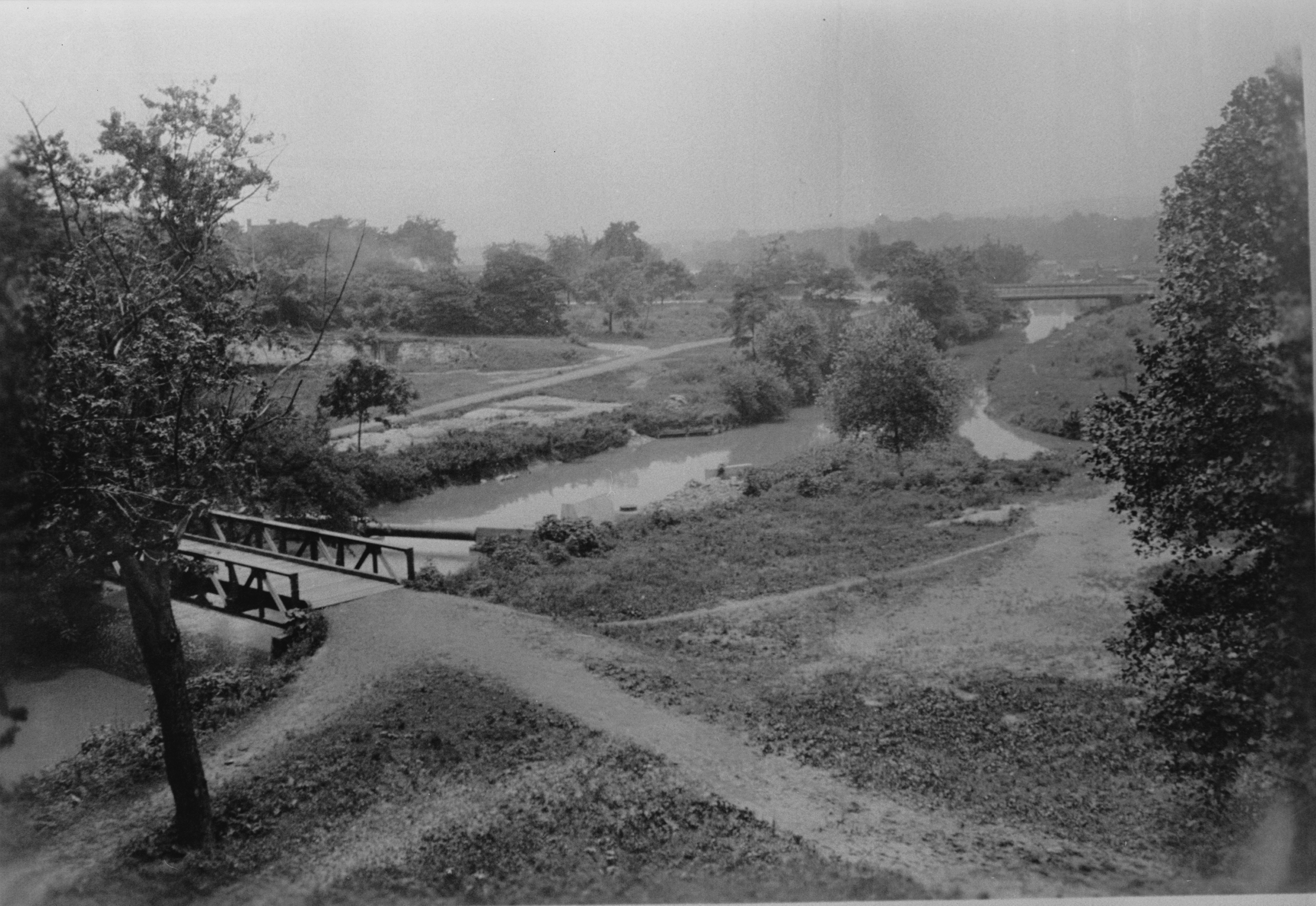
The 1907 bridge

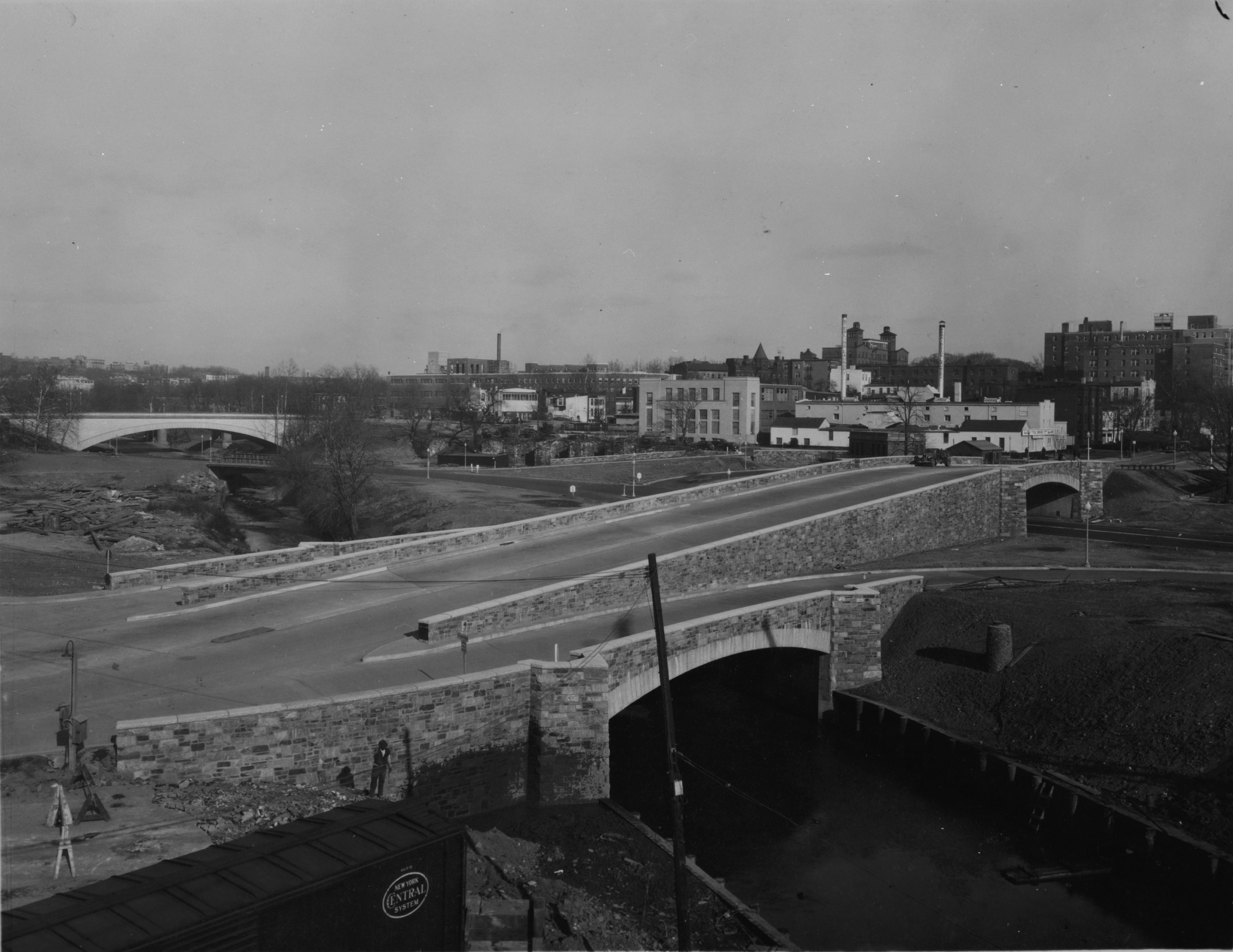
The original portion of the current bridge in 1941
