= K Street (Washington, D.C.) =

Political center in Washington, D.C.

K Street Northwest and Northeast
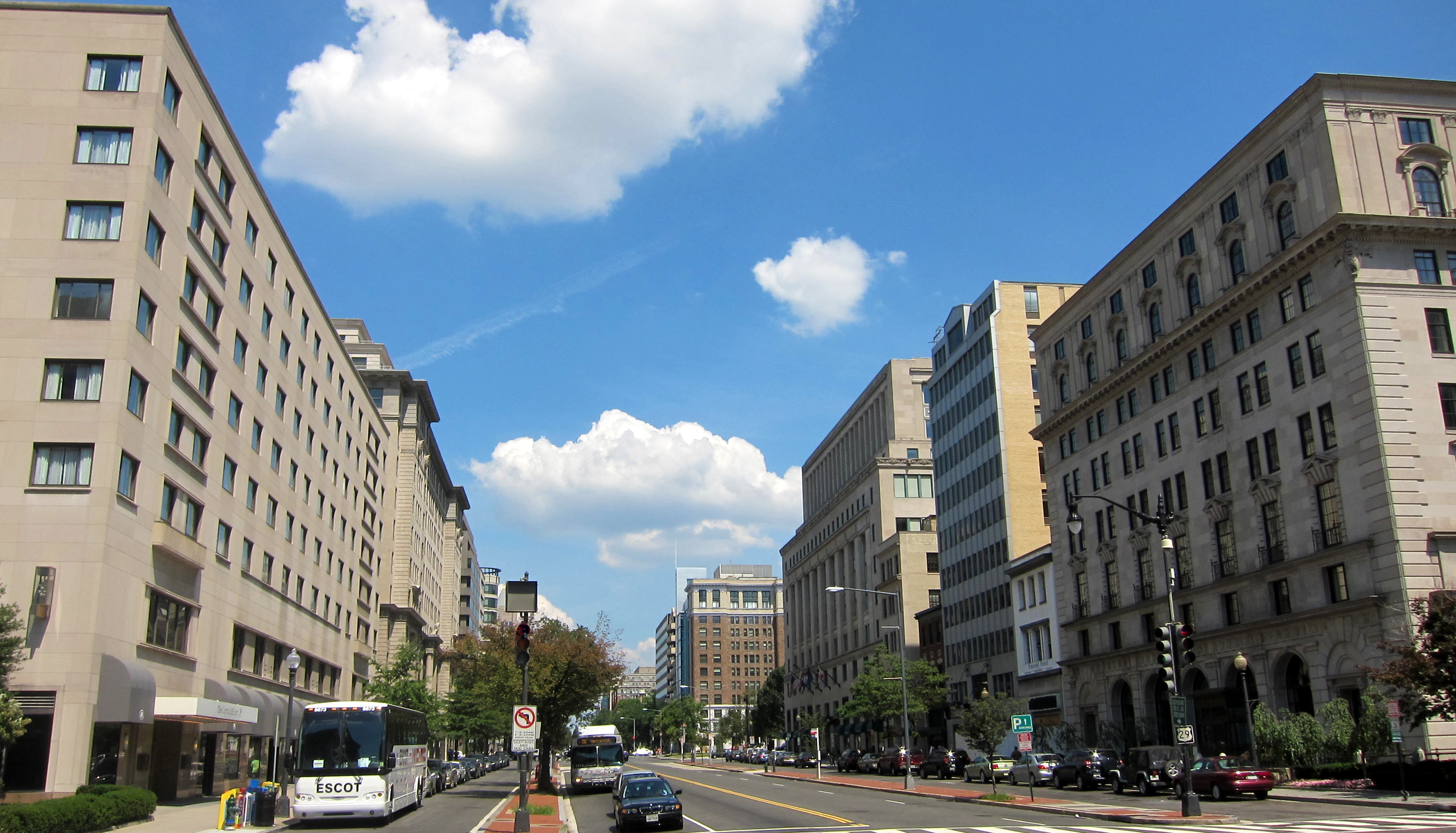
- The 1500 block of K Street NW in Downtown, Washington, D.C.
- Interactive map of K Street Northwest and Northeast
- Maintained by: DDOT
- Length: 4.0 mi (6.4 km)
- Location: Northwest and Northeast, Washington, D.C., U.S.
- West end: Wisconsin Avenue in Georgetown
- Major junctions: I-66 / US 29 / Rock Creek Parkway in West End; Pennsylvania / New Hampshire Avenues at Washington Circle; Connecticut Avenue at Farragut Square; Massachusetts / New York Avenues at Mount Vernon Square
- East end: Florida Avenue in Near Northeast
- North: L Street
- South: I Street

Construction
- Commissioned: 1791

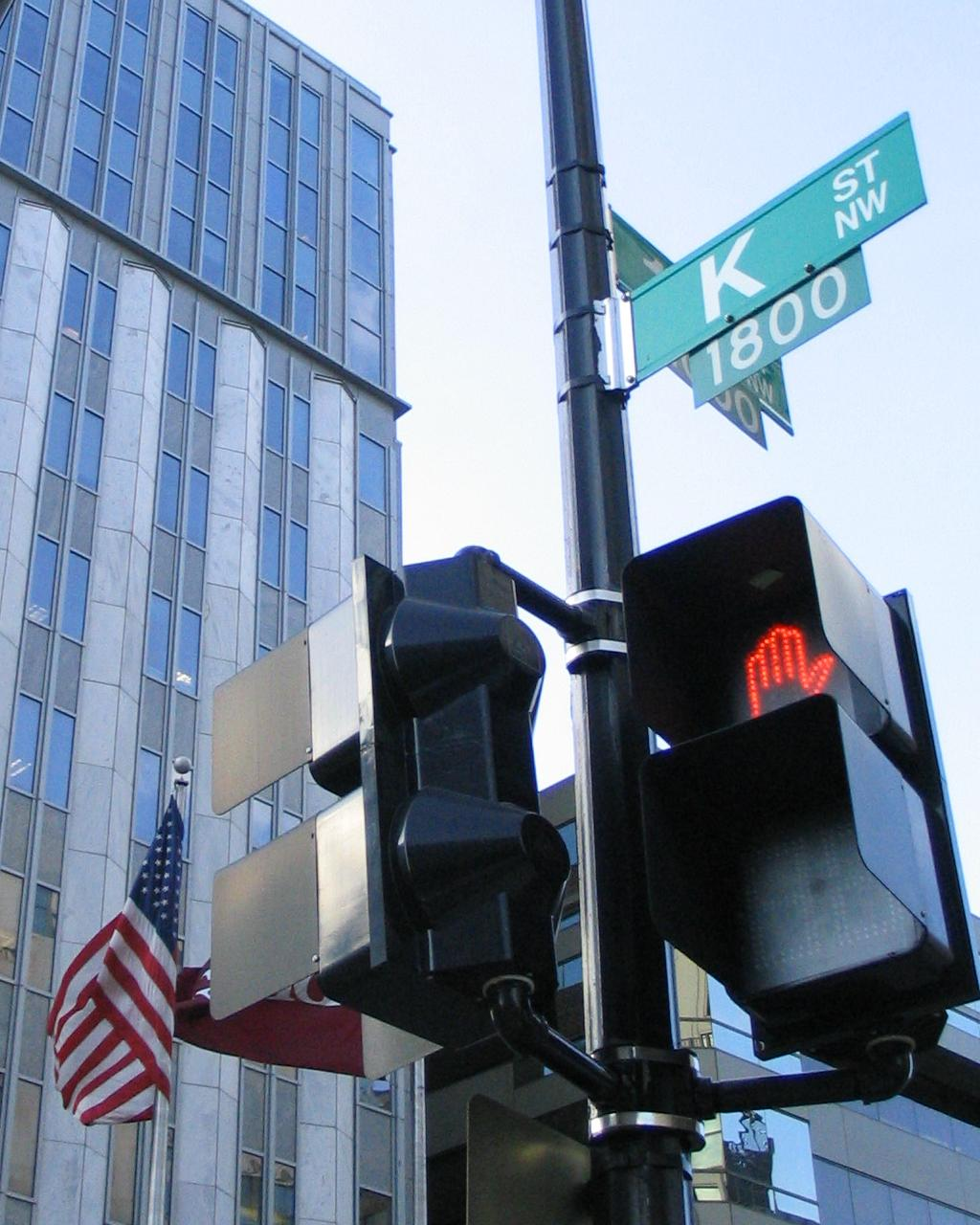
K Street in Washington, D.C. has become a metonym for the American lobbying industry.

K Street is a major thoroughfare in the United States capital of Washington, D.C., known as a center for lobbying and the location of numerous advocacy groups, law firms, trade associations, and think tanks. In political discourse, "K Street" has become a metonym for lobbying in the United States, the same way Wall Street in New York City became a metonym for the U.S. financial markets, since many lobbying firms are or traditionally were located on the section in Northwest Washington which passes from Georgetown through a portion of Downtown Washington, D.C.

== Location ==
In the Washington D.C. street grid there are three unconnected east-to-west street segments designated as K Street NW / NE, and also a southern K Street.

The middle segment of K Street NW / NE, which carries a segment of U.S. Route 29, begins in the city's Northwest quadrant as K Street NW, just west of the abutment of the old Aqueduct Bridge on the Georgetown waterfront. The street travels east underneath the Whitehurst Freeway, crosses Rock Creek on the K Street Bridge, and continues through downtown D.C. After its intersection with North Capitol Street, the street's designation changes to K Street NE as it enters the Northeast quadrant. The street ends at Florida Avenue in the Near Northeast neighborhood, just south of Gallaudet University.

K Street NE briefly reappears further east in the Carver neighborhood, extending from Bladensburg Road for six blocks to Maryland Avenue NE.

The westernmost (Georgetown) segment of K Street NW was known as Water Street before the Georgetown street renaming of 1895. West of 33rd Street NW, the United States Postal Service still recognizes both "K Street" and "Water Street" in addresses. The westernmost end of K Street occupies the former right of way of the Georgetown Branch of the Baltimore and Ohio Railroad. When that line was abandoned, K Street was extended west to the Washington Canoe Club. The rest of the Georgetown right of way is now occupied by the Capital Crescent Trail, which begins at the terminus of K Street.

The southern K Street runs between the Potomac and Anacostia rivers, crossing the Southwest and Southeast quadrants, as K Street SW and K Street SE, respectively.

== Traffic configuration ==
=== Current ===
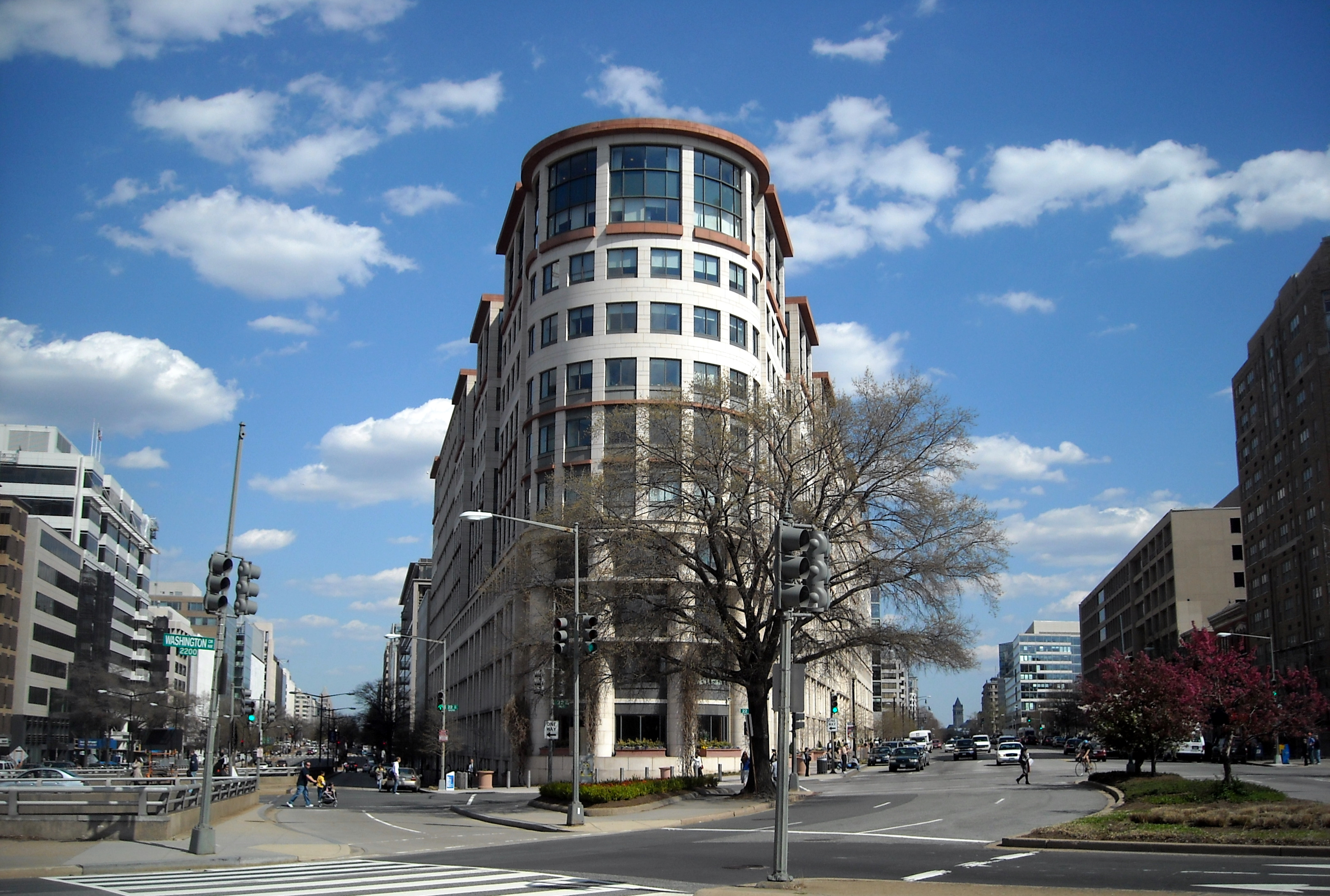
International Finance Corporation (IFC) Headquarters at the crossroads of K Street and Pennsylvania Avenue at Washington Circle in the Foggy Bottom neighborhood

K Street provides a major east–west thoroughfare for traffic through Washington, primarily from Mount Vernon Square to Whitehurst Freeway. The street continues through Georgetown under the Whitehurst Freeway; however most westbound traffic exits to the freeway. A portion of the street travels in a tunnel underneath Washington Circle, allowing through traffic to avoid the circle. Portions of the street are divided into both "local" (or service) lanes and "express" lanes in both directions.

=== Proposed ===
The Washington Metropolitan Area Transit Authority has been studying the conversion of K Street into part of a proposed busway. The route would begin at Georgetown University, cross downtown Washington on K Street, switch to Massachusetts Avenue at Mount Vernon Square, and end at Washington Union Station. The DC Circulator provided service along most of the proposed route before its phaseout on January 1, 2025, although it shared the right of way with other vehicles.

A streetcar line spanning from 26th Street NW to the H Street line's terminus at Union Station is planned as the next phase of DC's streetcar expansion.

A proposal announced on April 7, 2022, would redesign K Street between 12th and 21st Streets, N.W. The proposal would remove the service lanes in favor of dedicated bus and bicycle lanes. Under the proposal, construction would begin in the spring of 2023.

== Lobbying ==
"K Street" is the common metonym for Washington, D.C.'s lobbying industry, often used negatively in political campaign advertisements, the same way Wall Street in New York City became a metonym for the U.S. financial markets. Many of the major D.C.-based lobbying firms were located on the section in Northwest Washington which passes from Georgetown through a portion of downtown D.C., although the strip has grown less popular for lobbyists in recent years.

Since the late 1980s, many of the largest lobbying firms have moved off of K Street into larger spaces on adjacent streets; as of 2012, only one of the top-20 largest lobbying firms has a K Street address. The major lobbying firms that physically remain on K Street, as of 2017, include CGCN Group and K&L Gates; although smaller and midsized lobbying and advocacy groups as well as law firms, trade associations, some think tanks, and members of the public affairs industry who commonly interact with each other still occupy spaces on K Street and adjacent areas of Downtown Washington, D.C.

The 2003 HBO television series K Street about a lobbying firm takes its name and location from the street.

== See also ==
- Capitol Hill, a metonym for the United States Congress and the largest historic residential neighborhood in Washington, D.C.
- Rue de la loi in Brussels, the world second-largest lobbying location after K Street, focused on the European Union
- Think Tank Row, an area containing a notable cluster of think tanks located on or around Massachusetts Avenue NW in Washington, D.C., between Thomas Circle and Dupont Circle
- Tufton Street, a similar location in London hosting think-tanks and lobbyists
