= U.S. Route 29 in the District of Columbia =

Highway in the District of Columbia

U.S. Route 29
- US 29 highlighted in red

Route information
- Maintained by District of Columbia DOT
- Length: 8.6 mi (13.8 km)

Major junctions
- South end: US 29 in Rosslyn, VA
- I-66 in Foggy Bottom; US 1 in Shaw
- North end: US 29 / Eastern Avenue in Silver Spring, MD

Location
- Country: United States
- Federal district: District of Columbia

Highway system
- United States Numbered Highway System; List; Special; Divided; Streets and Highways of Washington, DC; Interstate; US; DC; State-Named Streets
← US 1	→ US 50

U.S. Route 29 (US 29) enters Washington, D.C., via the Key Bridge from Arlington County, Virginia, and exits at Silver Spring, Maryland. It predominantly follows city surface streets, although the portion of the route from the Key Bridge east to 26th Street Northwest is an elevated highway better known as the Whitehurst Freeway. The freeway, called the city's most ridiculed bridge in 1989, has survived several proposals for its demolition.

== Route description ==
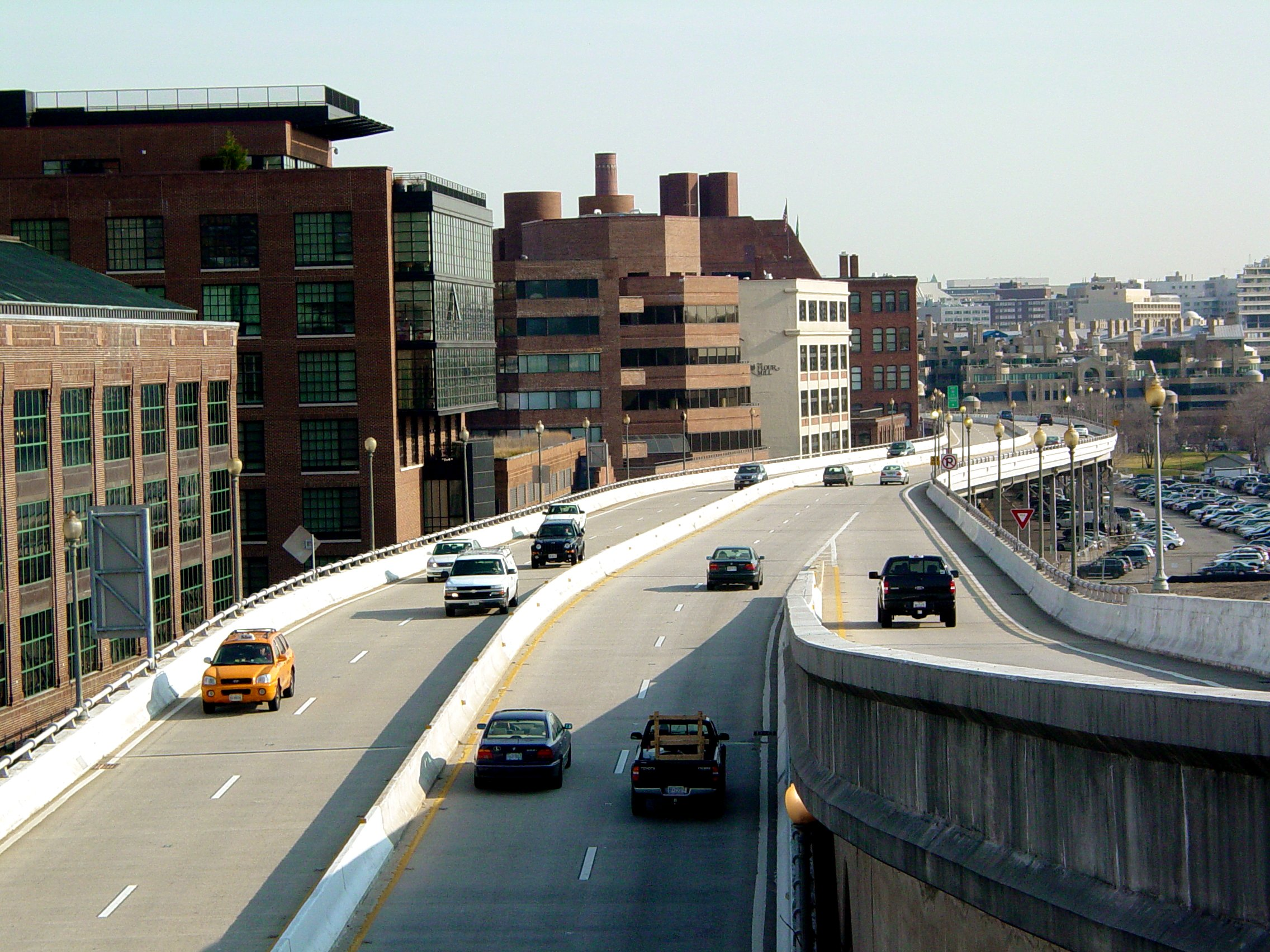
The Whitehurst Freeway as seen from the Key Bridge

From Virginia, US 29 enters the District of Columbia on the Key Bridge. It then bypasses Georgetown on the Whitehurst Freeway, an elevated highway over K Street Northwest and Water Street Northwest. After crossing the K Street Bridge, US 29 then travels along K Street Northwest through Downtown. From K Street, US 29 turns left at 11th Street Northwest, then right at Rhode Island Avenue Northwest. US 29 northbound turns left at 6th Street Northwest, then left again onto Florida Avenue Northwest before turning right onto Georgia Avenue Northwest. US 29 southbound traffic on Georgia Avenue continues straight at Florida Avenue, where Georgia Avenue becomes 7th Street Northwest, then turns right at Rhode Island Avenue Northwest. US 29 follows Georgia Avenue Northwest out of DC and into Maryland.

== History ==
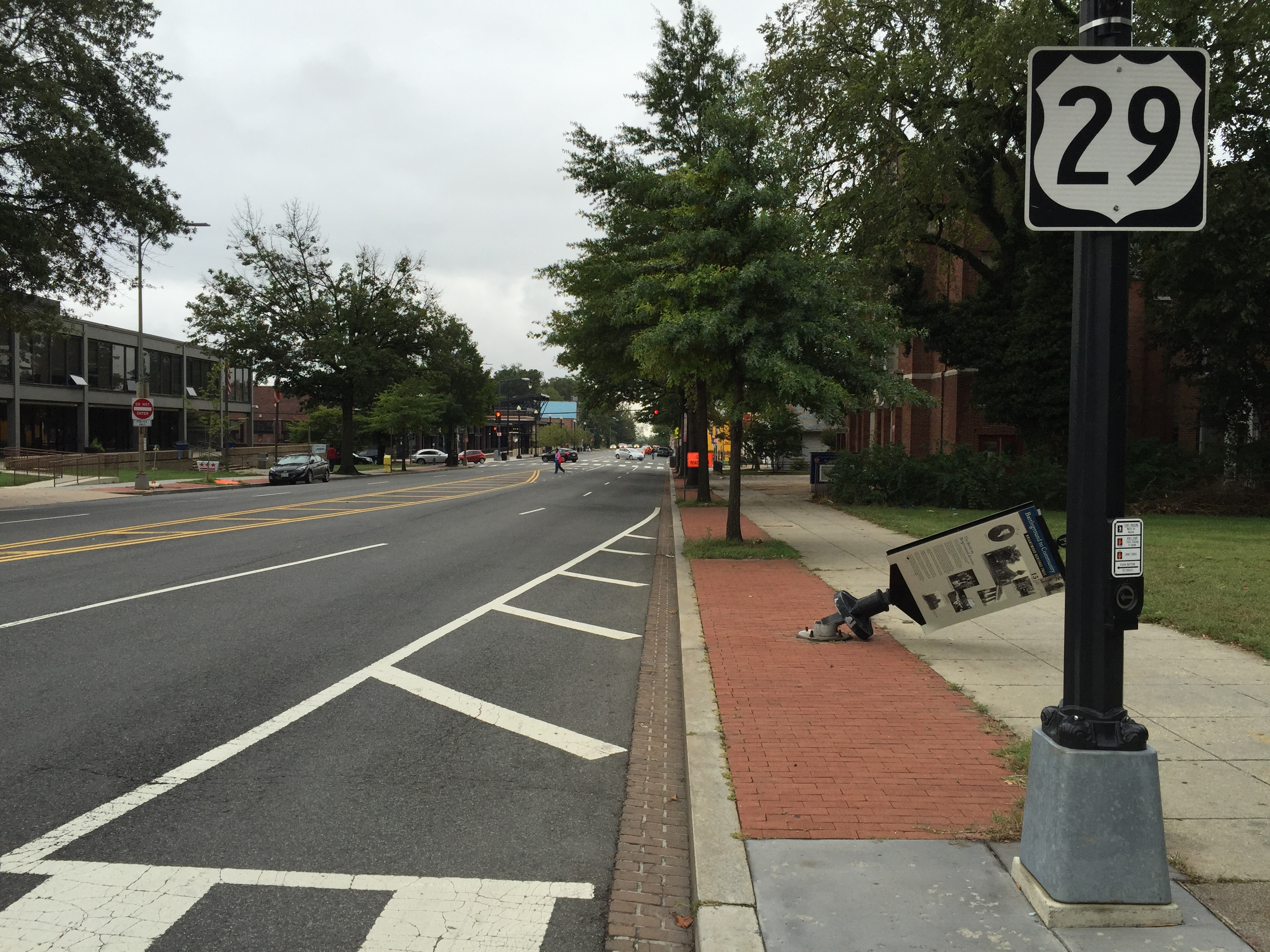
View south along US 29 on Georgia Avenue

US 29 has taken several routes through D.C. over the decades, including segments along New Hampshire Avenue NW, Dupont Circle, 16th Street Northwest, and Alaska Avenue NW.

Before the Whitehurst Freeway was built, the Georgetown waterfront experienced periods of prosperity and decline. The freeway was seen as a component of what would eventually be the "Inner Loop", a system of three concentric high-speed freeways. The Whitehurst Freeway would form part of the innermost loop, which was an ellipse roughly centered on and built about one mile (1.6 km) from the White House. (By the 1950s, planners envisioned replacing the Whitehurst Freeway with a much more massive, eight-lane road.) Planning for a "sky-road" above K Street Northwest along the Georgetown waterfront was already long-planned by the time architectural drawings were released to the public in December 1941. Congress authorized construction of the freeway on January 24, 1942, and appropriated $2.2 million (equivalent to $33.3 million in 2024) of federal funds for its construction on February 6. But, with the outbreak of World War II and the diversion of steel for war material, construction of the freeway was indefinitely postponed in May 1942. Gas rationing during the war caused the number of automobiles on roads to drop precipitously, helping to make the freeway unnecessary. Planning for postwar construction did not cease during the war, however. In May 1943, the U.S. Commission of Fine Arts approved a plan for postwar construction in Washington that gave a high priority to the K Street freeway in fiscal 1947 (which began in July 1946).

Construction of the $3.294-million (equivalent to $34.3 million in 2024) freeway began on June 1, 1947. The structure was built by engineer Archibald Alexander. The Des Moines, Iowa, firm of Alexander & Repass successfully bid to construct the viaduct. The cost of the freeway was split between the DC and federal governments, with cost overruns to be paid from DC reserves. Extra federal funds were procured in the fiscal 1949 budget to speed its construction. Construction of the freeway required the demolition of the Key House at 3516 M Street Northwest. Although efforts to have the home dismantled rather than demolished were successful, President Harry S. Truman declined to expend federal funds to have the home rebuilt elsewhere, and the structure went into storage. (Note: The structure had been radically changed since it was owned by Francis Scott Key, and its historic value has been contested by the National Park Service (NPS). Nonetheless, the NPS lost track of the dismantled structure by 1981. An NPS investigation discovered the building materials were stolen by local residents, and what remained had been disposed of informally after 1948.)

Herbert C. Whitehurst, director of the DC highway department, died on September 1, 1948. A week later, his successor, Gordon R. Young, suggested that the then-under construction freeway should be named for him, in honor of his leadership in constructing many highway and bridges, including the new Chain Bridge; the Dupont, Scott, and Thomas Circle underpasses; the Fourteenth Street Bridge; the Calvert Street Bridge; and the Klingle Street Bridge. The Commissioners of the District of Columbia approved naming the freeway after Whitehurst.

The Whitehurst Freeway opened on October 8, 1949. Whitehurst's granddaughter Maria cut the ceremonial ribbon during the opening ceremonies.

=== Proposed demolition of Whitehurst Freeway ===
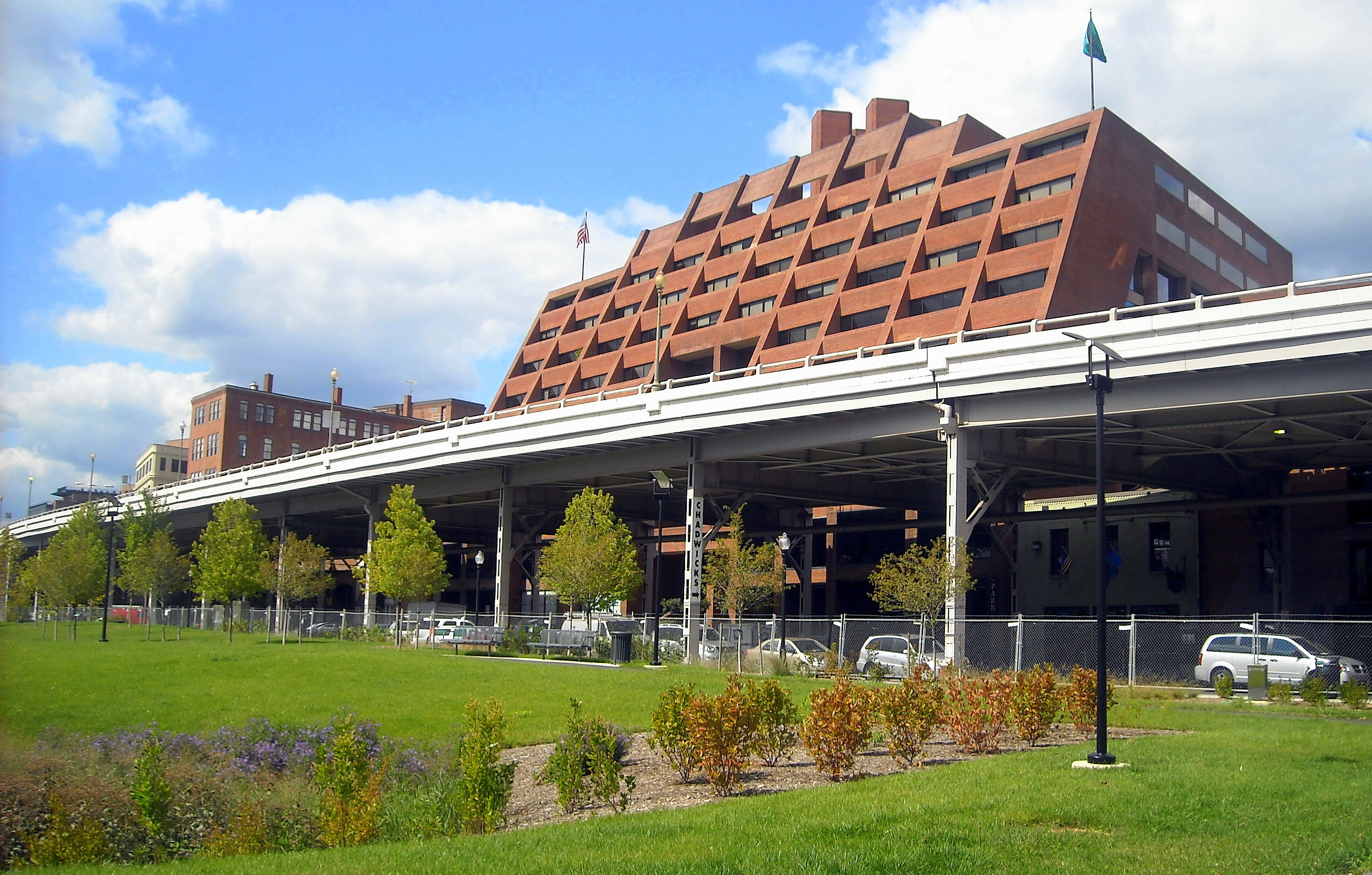
The Whitehurst Freeway and K Street Northwest as seen from Georgetown Waterfront Park

Demolition of the Whitehurst Freeway was first proposed in 1970. A report commissioned by the National Capital Planning Commission and the Georgetown Citizens' Association said the freeway blocked vistas, inhibited development of the waterfront, was poorly engineered, and caused traffic backups at both of its ends. The report urged the city to bury the freeway in an enclosed trench and sell the air rights above it to developers or use it as parkland. But in 1977, DC director of municipal planning Ben Gilbert claimed that the Whitehurst Freeway's "removal is not practical in the near future and maybe never".

In 1985, DC Mayor Marion Barry said he wanted to retain the Whitehurst Freeway.

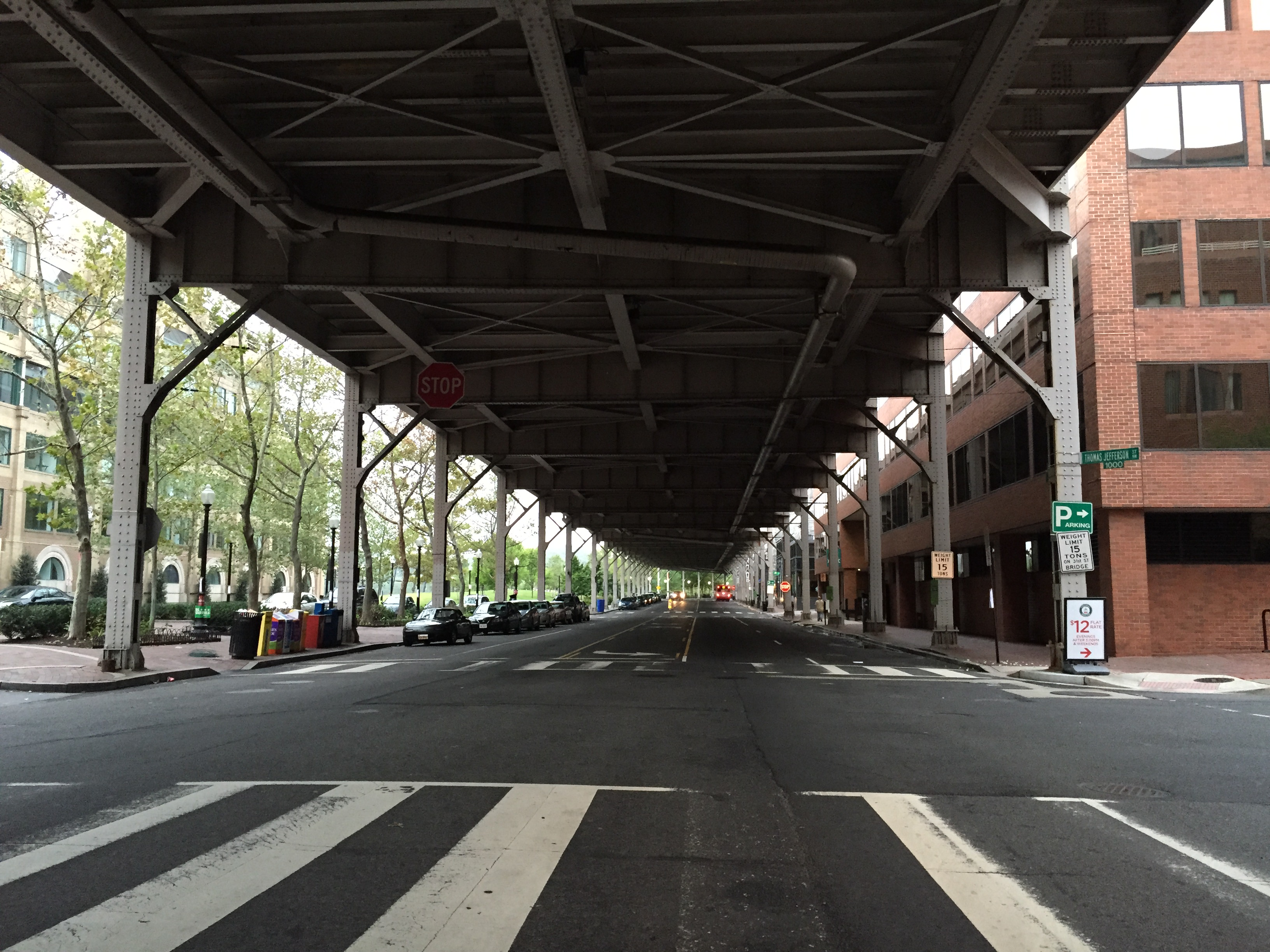
View west along K Street underneath the Whitehurst Freeway

City public works officials implemented a $47-million (equivalent to $103 million in 2024) rehabilitation of the Whitehurst Freeway in 1989. The year-long construction project, which would be 80 percent paid for by the federal government and take more than a year to complete, added shoulders to the freeway that widened it to 60 feet (18 m) from 52 feet (16 m), replaced the entire deck, added drains, and improved the lighting. Officials also sandblasted rust and old paint from the understructure and repainted it. A westbound ramp used to access the Key Bridge was also eliminated, and replaced with a new traffic route that required motorists to go to Canal Road Northwest/M Street Northwest, wait for the traffic light, and turn east to access the Key Bridge. Two unused ramps at the eastern end of Whitehurst Freeway were also demolished. (The ramps were built to connect the freeway to the proposed Inner Loop, but that project was never constructed.) Prior to the rehabilitation, city officials studied the feasibility and cost of either burying the freeway in a tunnel or widening K Street Northwest into a much larger boulevard. Cost considerations (one cost estimate for the tunnel was $400 million, equivalent to $846 million in 2024) and the inability to connect the tunnel or boulevard to the Key Bridge far above it ruled out both options. Construction on the renovation began in December 1990.

In 1991, with refurbishment of the Whitehurst Freeway about 40 percent complete, Georgetown residents asked the new mayor, Sharon Pratt, to reverse the Barry administration's decision and tear down the Whitehurst Freeway. Pratt declined to do so.

In 2007, DC Mayor Adrian Fenty halted plans for an environmental impact study for the proposed demolition, stating that his administration is "not going to be spending money on this particular issue. You do not have to worry."

=== Proposed route ===
In 1960, the District Department of Transportation proposed construction of a new Potomac River Freeway. The Whitehurst Freeway and portion of US 29 carried by it would be redesignated as the Potomac River Freeway. The new parkway would be built on top of Canal Road Northwest and extend to the Georgetown Reservoir, where it would connect to the George Washington Memorial Parkway (called the Clara Barton Parkway after 1989). A proposed spur of the Potomac River Freeway, designated Interstate 266 (I-266), would begin at the junction of the Potomac River Freeway and Foxhall Road Northwest and be carried over a proposed Three Sisters Bridge to Virginia. There it would connect (via an as-yet-undefined route) with I-66.

== Major intersections ==
Location	mi	km	Destinations	Notes
Potomac River	0.0	0.0	US 29 south – Rosslyn	Continuation into Virginia
Potomac River	0.1	0.16	Key Bridge	
Georgetown	0.3	0.48	M Street NW	Western terminus of Whitehurst Freeway
Georgetown–Foggy Bottom line	0.8	1.3	I-66 west / E Street Expressway – Kennedy Center	Northbound exit and southbound entrance; eastern terminus of I-66
Foggy Bottom	0.9	1.4	To Rock Creek and Potomac Parkway north / 27th Street NW west / I-66	No northbound access to Rock Creek Parkway; eastern terminus of Whitehurst Freeway
Foggy Bottom	1.0	1.6	K Street NW west	Southbound exit and northbound entrance
Foggy Bottom	1.3	2.1	Tunnel underneath Washington Circle	
Shaw	3.1	5.0	US 1 (Rhode Island Avenue NW east / 6th Street NW south)	US 29 transitions between Rhode Island Avenue and 6th Street
Shepherd Park	8.6	13.8	US 29 north (Georgia Avenue) / Eastern Avenue NW	Continuation into Maryland
1.000 mi = 1.609 km; 1.000 km = 0.621 mi: Incomplete access

== Notes ==
U.S. Route 29
Previous state: Virginia	District of Columbia	Next state: Maryland
