= Saddle Club Footbridge =

Coordinates: 38°55′12″N 77°03′12″W

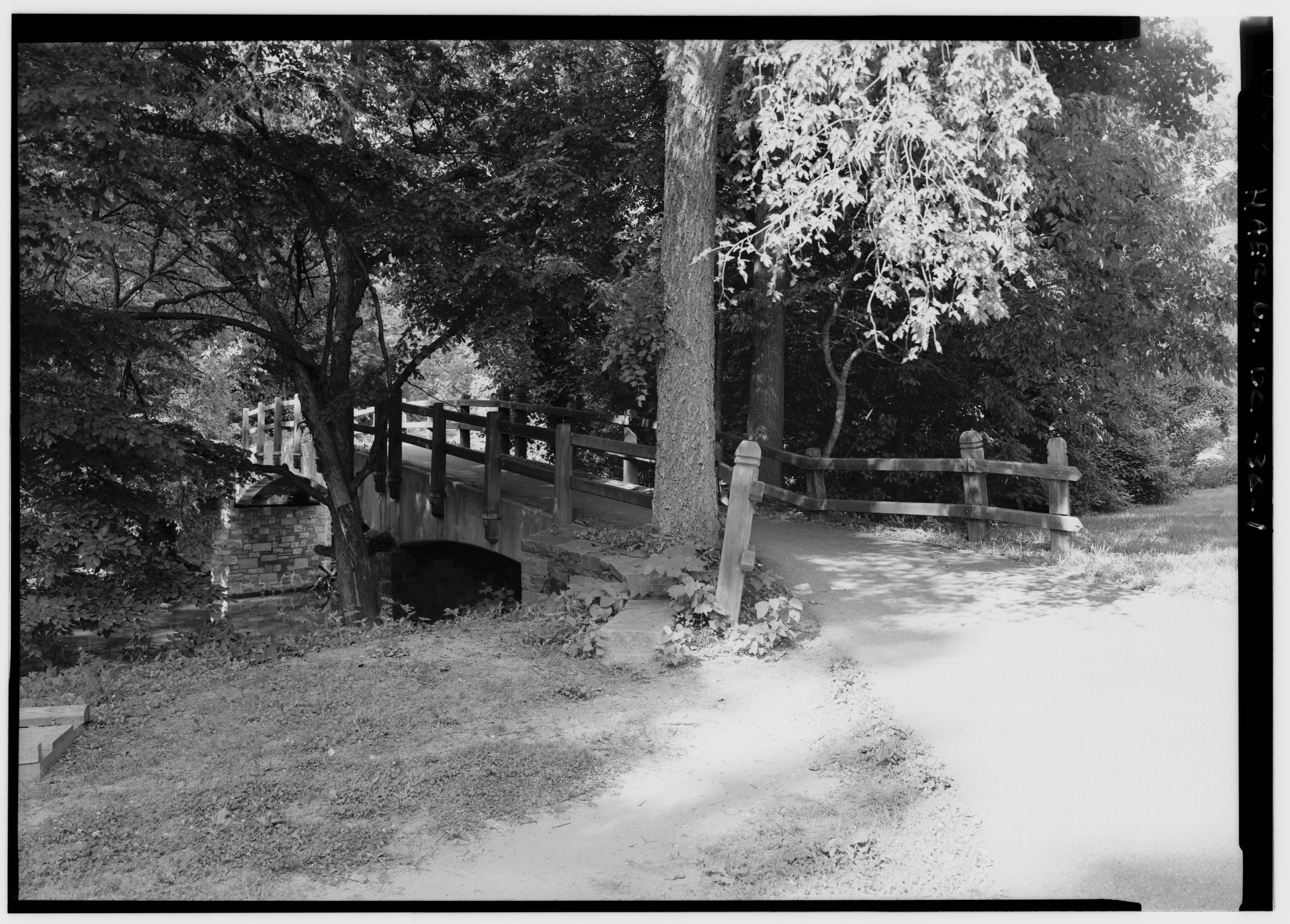
The Saddle Club Footbridge in 1993

The Saddle Club Footbridge is a pedestrian bridge over Rock Creek in Washington, D.C. completed in 1934. It is one of eight such pedestrian bridges completed during the Great Depression. It has square-cut ashlar stone abutments, a concrete arch deck, and wooden railings. The bridge cost $3,830 to construct.
