= M Street Bridge (Washington, D.C.) =

Bridge in Washington, D.C.

Coordinates: 38°54′19″N 77°03′20″W

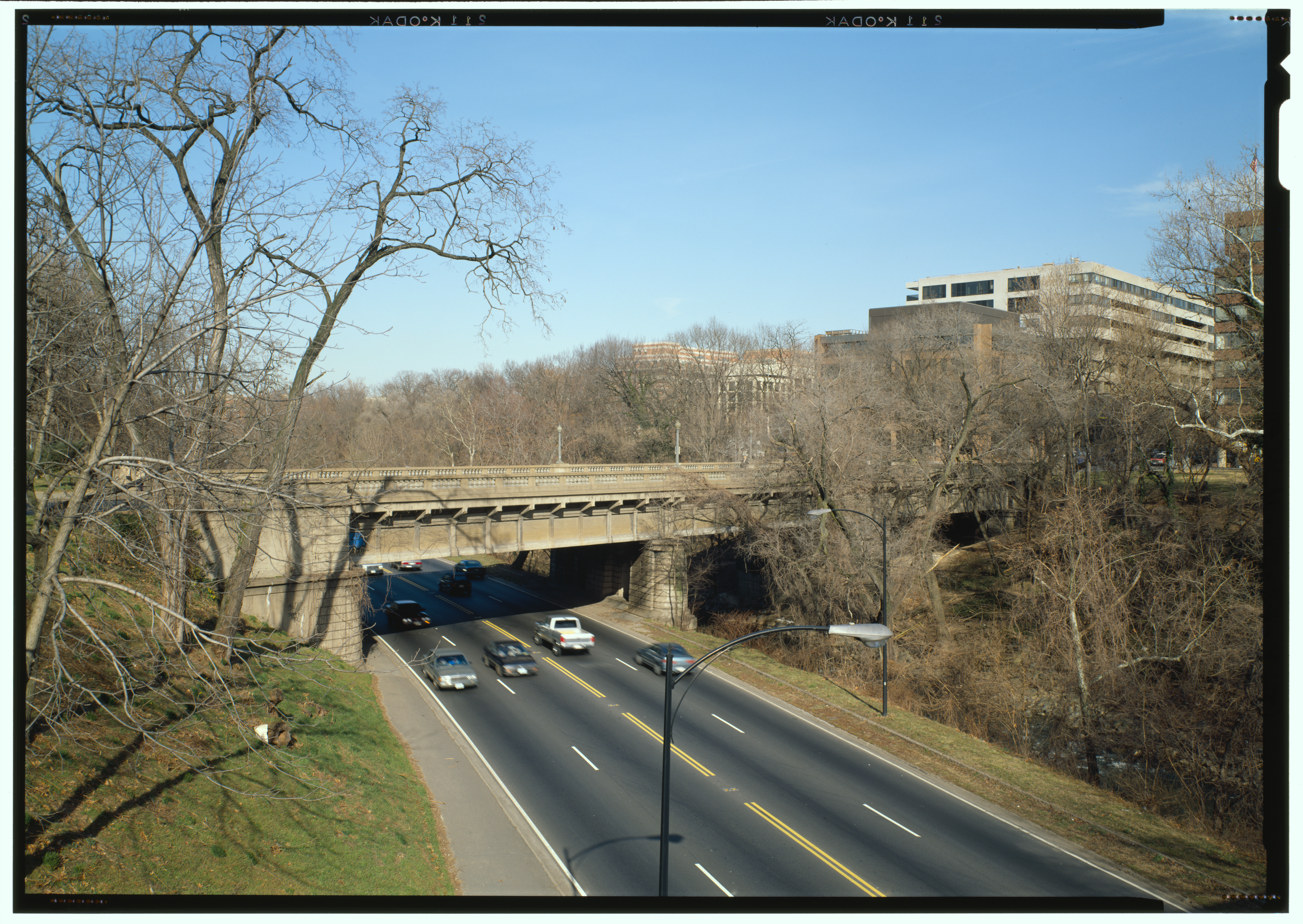
M Street Bridge

The M Street Bridge, also known as the M Street Overpass, carries M Street across Rock Creek and the Rock Creek and Potomac Parkway. It lies between the neighborhoods of Georgetown and Foggy Bottom in Northwest Washington, D.C. The non-arched design of the bridge contrasts with that of all the other bridges rising over the parkway.

== History ==
The original wooden bridge at the site was the first in the current District of Columbia, constructed in 1788 by the City of Georgetown two years before it was incorporated into the District. The bridge reportedly collapsed during a severe storm, leading to a legend that the ghosts of a stagecoach driver and his horses that drowned in the collapse could be seen thereafter, still attempting to cross the bridge.

It was replaced by a heavy wooden drawbridge in 1800, as Rock Creek was wide and deep enough that sailing ships needed to transit the bridge at that time. However, the creek became unnavigable by the 1830s due to silt from upstream construction and agricultural uses, as well as the construction of a quay obstructing the mouth of the creek. A covered wooden bridge replaced the drawbridge in 1839, followed by a steel-truss bridge in 1871, which was closed in 1925 because it had become structurally unsound. Remnants of the western abutment of the 1871 bridge still exist adjacent to that of the current bridge.

== Design ==
The current bridge was initially contemplated as a steel-girder bridge for cost reasons and the belief that an arch bridge could not be built large enough to accommodate the parkway, then planned to run underneath it. The bridge was one of the few to be designed solely by the office of the District of Columbia Engineer of Bridges without input from an outside private firm. The United States Commission of Fine Arts (CFA), the agency tasked with reviewing architectural projects in the capital, under Charles Moore opposed the design because it did not conform with the other park bridges, which were designed to harmonize with their surroundings. The designers attempted to compromise by encasing the bridge in concrete and adding ornamentation. Still, Moore was not appeased, calling the new design "a brutal bridge, entirely inconsistent with any other parkway treatment" and stating that "the design is fundamentally bad. A bridge constructed along such lines would be a perpetual eyesore." Moore also objected that adding ornamentation would not satisfy the bridge's fundamental design principles perceived as lacking.

The D.C. Board of Commissioners decided to proceed with the design despite the formal disapproval of the CFA since the legislation authorizing the bridge specified a steel-girder design and only mandated consultation with the CFA but did not require that their recommendations be followed. This situation led to the passage of the Shipstead-Luce Act in 1930, which gave the commission legal authority to enforce their decisions. The bridge was constructed in 1929 and 1930.

== See also ==
- List of bridges documented by the Historic American Engineering Record in Washington, D.C.
