= Boulder Bridge =

Historic bridge in Washington, D.C., United States

- Boulder Bridge and Ross Drive Bridge
- U.S. National Register of Historic Places
- U.S. Historic district – Contributing property
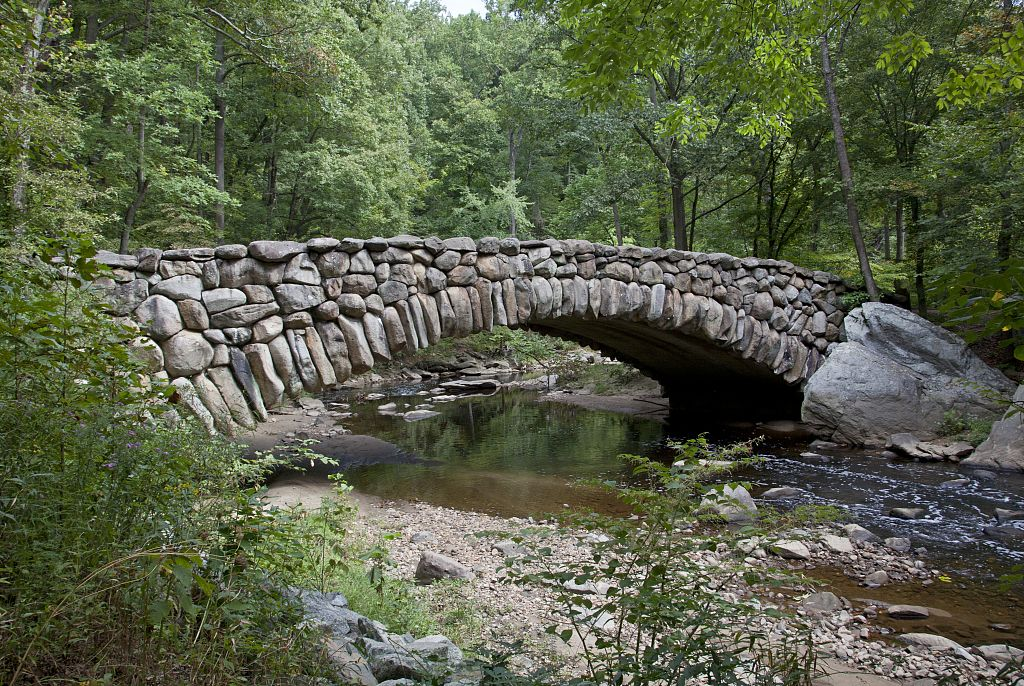
- Boulder Bridge

- Location within the District of Columbia Location within the United States
- Location: Rock Creek Park; Washington, D.C. United States
- Coordinates: 38°56′54″N 77°02′40″W
- Built: 1902
- Architect: W. J. Douglas; Army Corps of Engineers
- Architectural style: Melan style
- Part of: Rock Creek Park Historic District (ID91001524)
- NRHP reference No.: 80000348

Significant dates
- Added to NRHP: March 20, 1980
- Designated CP: October 23, 1991

The Boulder Bridge is a historic bridge located in the Washington, D.C. portion of Rock Creek Park, an urban national park listed on the National Register of Historic Places.

Boulder Bridge was constructed in 1902 and carries Beach Drive across Rock Creek, a tributary of the Potomac River. The reinforced concrete arch bridge was designed by architect W. J. Douglas and was built at a cost of $17,636.

Boulder Bridge and Ross Drive Bridge were added to the National Register of Historic Places on March 20, 1980. In addition, the bridges are contributing properties to the Rock Creek Park Historic District.

== See also ==
- List of bridges on the National Register of Historic Places in Washington, D.C.
- National Register of Historic Places listings in the District of Columbia
- Rock Creek and Potomac Parkway
