= Woodrow Wilson Bridge =

Bascule bridge over the Potomac River

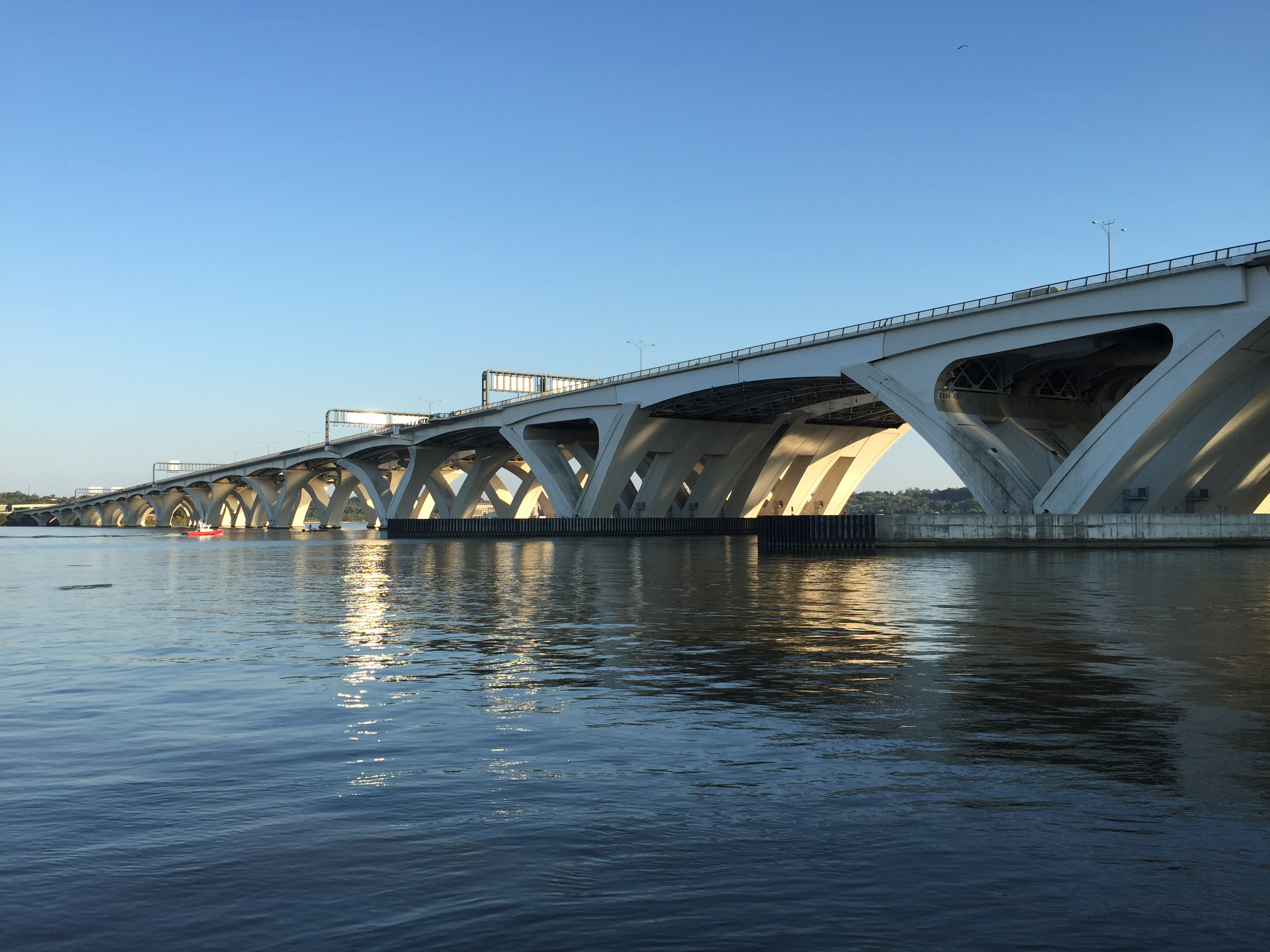
- Woodrow Wilson Bridge in October 2016
- Coordinates: 38.793396°N 77.03167°W
- Carries: 12 lanes of I-95 / I-495, pedestrian traffic
- Crosses: Potomac River
- Locale: Alexandria, Virginia; Washington, D.C.; and Oxon Hill, Maryland
- Official name: Woodrow Wilson Memorial Bridge in April 2007
- Other name: Wilson Bridge
- Maintained by: Virginia Department of Transportation and Maryland State Highway Administration

Characteristics
- Design: Double-leaf bascule bridge
- Total length: 6,736 feet (2,053 m)
- Clearance below: 70 feet (21 m)

History
- Opened: December 28, 1961 (original span); June 10, 2006; 20 years ago (new outer loop span); May 30, 2008; 18 years ago (new inner loop span)
- Closed: 1961 span closed July 15, 2006. Demolished August 29, 2006.

Statistics
- Daily traffic: Approx 250,000 vehicles/day

Location
- Interactive map of Woodrow Wilson Bridge

The Woodrow Wilson Memorial Bridge, also known as the Woodrow Wilson Bridge or the Wilson Bridge, is a bascule bridge that spans the Potomac River between Alexandria, Virginia, and Oxon Hill, Maryland, in Prince George's County, Maryland. The original bridge was one of only a handful of drawbridges in the Interstate Highway System. It contained the only portion of the Interstate System owned and operated by the federal government until construction was completed and it was turned over to the Virginia and Maryland departments of transportation.

The Wilson Bridge carries Interstate 95 (I-95) and I-495 Capital Beltway. The drawbridge on the original span opened about 260 times a year, frequently disrupting traffic on a bridge that carried about 250,000 cars each day. The new, higher span requires fewer openings.

The bridge's west abutment is in Virginia, a small portion is in Washington, D.C., and the remaining majority of it is within Maryland (because that section of the Potomac River is within Maryland's borders). About 300 feet (90 m) of the western midspan portion of the bridge crosses the tip of the southernmost corner of the District of Columbia. It is the only bridge in the US that crosses the borders of three state-level jurisdictions (DC, Maryland, and Virginia). The section in Washington DC is also the shortest segment of Interstate Highway between state lines.

The bridge is named for the 28th president of the U.S., Woodrow Wilson (1856–1924), a native of Staunton, Virginia. While he was president, Wilson reportedly spent an average of two hours a day riding in his automobile to relax or to "loosen his mind from the problems before him". President Wilson was an advocate of automobile and highway improvements in the U.S. In 1916, he said, "My interest in good roads is [...] to bind communities together and open their intercourse, so that it will flow with absolute freedom and facility".

== Original bridge ==
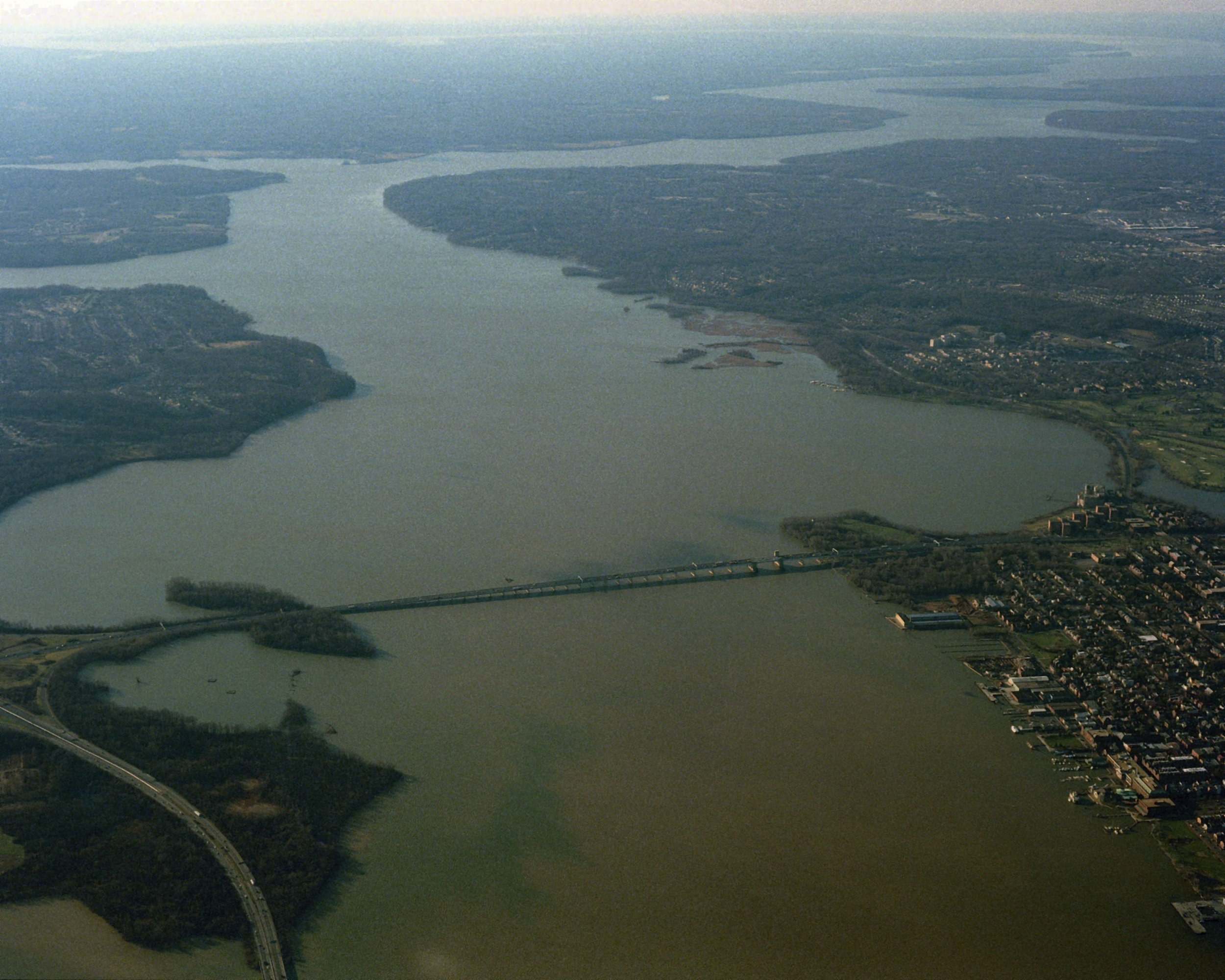
The original Wilson Bridge from the north in 1991

A bridge at Jones Point was first proposed by the District Highway Department in August 1952 as part of a study of Potomac River bridge crossing needs. The bridge linked to US Route 1 and the Henry G. Shirley Memorial Highway in Virginia. In Prince George's County, Maryland, the bridge would connect with Overlook Avenue and Chesapeake Street. It was also intended to link with the proposed extension of the George Washington Memorial Parkway/Anacostia–Kenilworth Parkway (later built as the southern leg of the Anacostia Freeway) in Prince George's County (authorized by Congress in 1930 but never built) and the Inter-County Metropolitan Freeway (proposed in 1944 and later planned and constructed as the Capital Beltway). The Regional Planning Council approved construction of the bridge just four months later. The bridge won the backing of Representative Joel Broyhill of Virginia, who championed legislation funding its construction in Congress. By November 1953, the US Department of the Interior had also recommended its construction. Congress authorized construction of the bridge on August 17, 1954, and President Dwight D. Eisenhower signed the measure into law later that month.

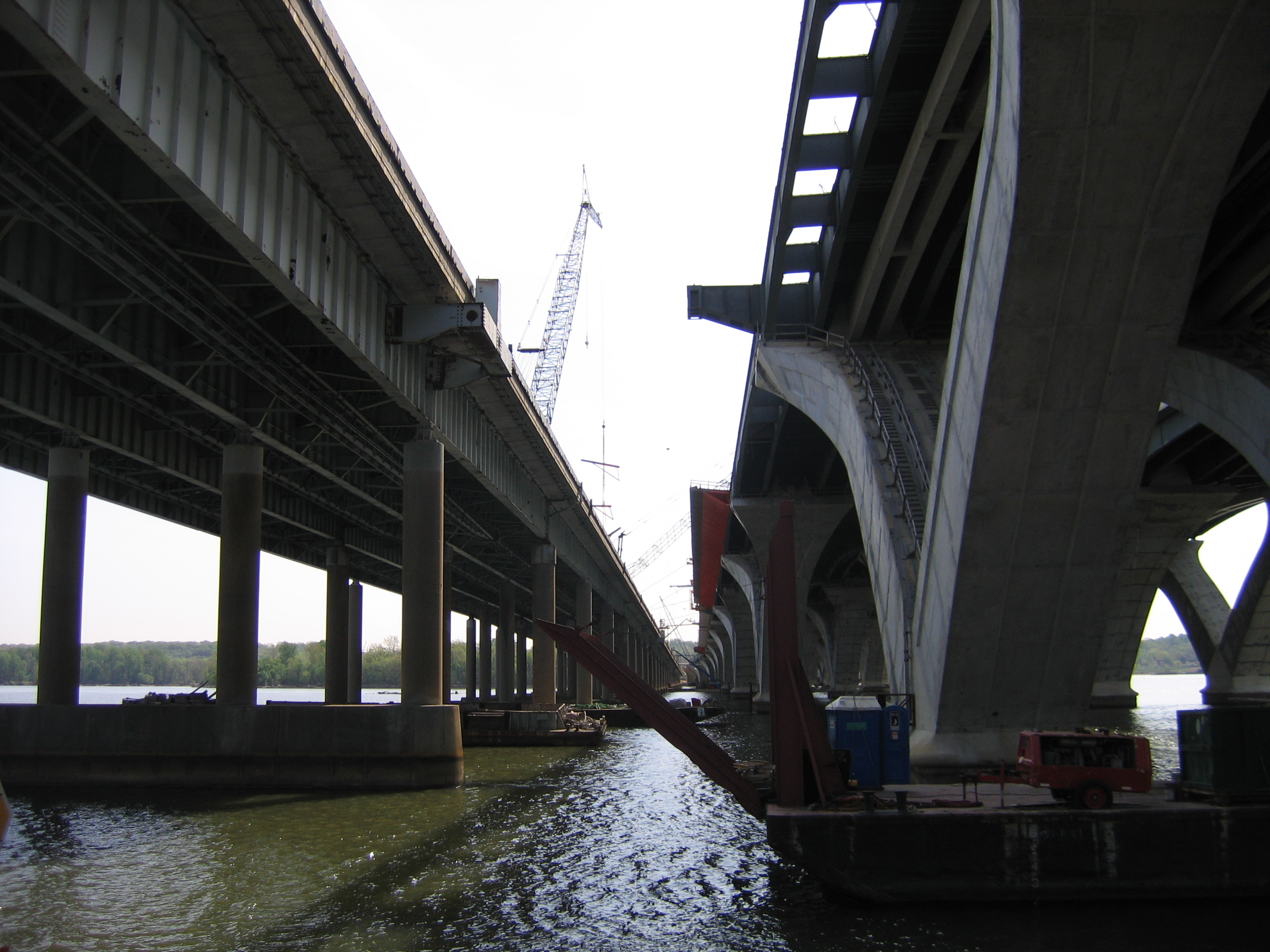
The original and new spans side-by-side in 2007

The bridge received its name through the efforts of Representative Burr Harrison, a Virginian who sought to honor the 100th anniversary of the birth of Woodrow Wilson. Eisenhower signed this legislation into law on May 22, 1956, as part of a bill authorizing initial funding for the bridge. Construction of the bridge began in September 1958, and it opened to traffic on December 28, 1961. Edith Wilson, Wilson's widow, died that very morning; she was supposed to have been the guest of honor at the bridge's dedication ceremony. The 5,900-foot (1,800 m) bridge included a bascule bridge to allow large, ocean-going vessels access to the port facilities of Washington DC. It had six traffic lanes and was designed to handle 75,000 vehicles a day.

By 1999, the old Wilson Bridge was handling 200,000 vehicles a day, more than 2.6 times the original design capacity. The bridge had serious maintenance problems and underwent continuous patchwork maintenance beginning in the 1970s. It was completely redecked in 1982 and 1983.

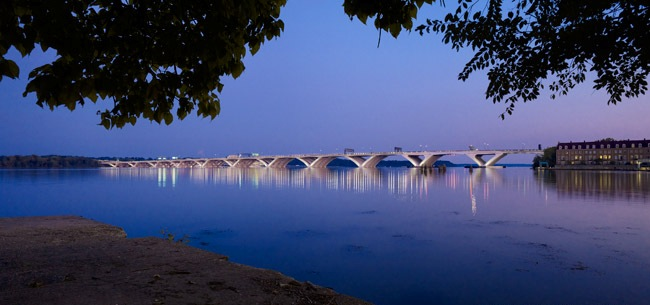
The Wilson Bridge at night

One of the reasons for the inadequate design was that it was not originally planned to be part of the major north–south I-95, but rather, as part of the circumferential Capital Beltway. I-95 was planned to bisect the Capital Beltway with a shorter through-route, extending north from Springfield, Virginia, across the Potomac River, through downtown Washington DC, and the northeastern section of DC, and into Maryland to reconnect with the beltway near College Park, Maryland. While the portions in Virginia and in DC south of New York Avenue were built, the remaining segment—designated the Northeast Freeway—was opposed by residents, and construction was canceled in the late 1970s. The portion north of Springfield was designated as a spur, I-395 (Shirley Highway). The eastern half of the Capital Beltway was additionally signed as I‑95.

Traffic was also boosted by growth in the Washington metropolitan area and increases in suburb-to-suburb commuting. Because housing costs in Prince George's County, Maryland, are much lower than in Northern Virginia—which saw enormous job growth in recent decades—tens of thousands of workers commute daily over the bridge, a situation not anticipated when it was constructed. After the highway on both sides of the bridge was widened to eight lanes, the six-lane bridge became a daily bottleneck as heavy traffic slowed in order to funnel into fewer lanes. Two incidents demonstrated this. On November 11, 1987, a snowstorm snarled traffic; many commuters ran out of gas and spent the night in their vehicles on the bridge. In November 1998, the bridge was closed for several hours during the afternoon rush hour when Ivin L. Pointer engaged police in a seven-hour standoff, creating 20-mile (32 km) traffic backups. (Pointer jumped off the bridge, but survived the fall.)

== Replacement bridge ==
=== Construction ===
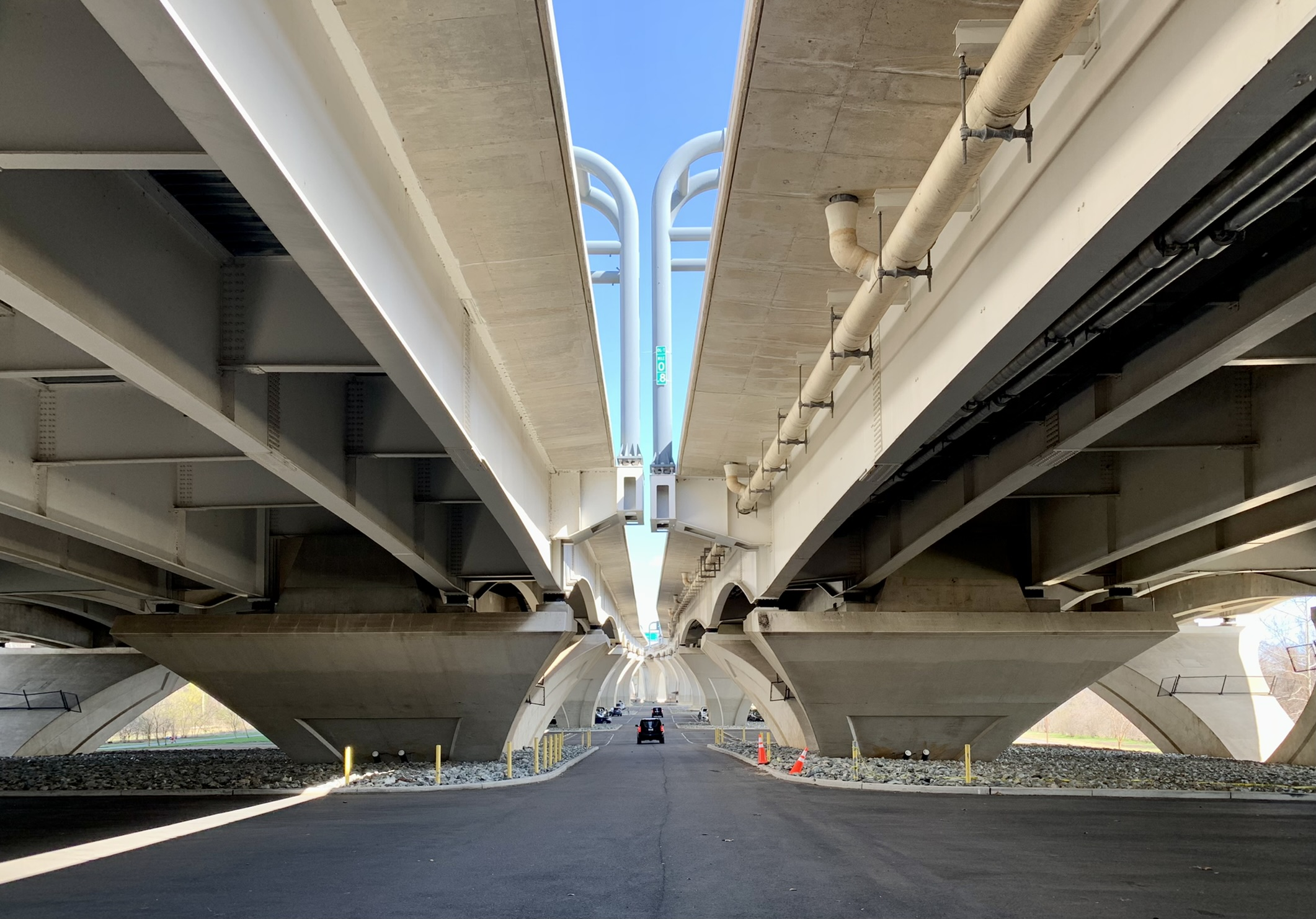
The underside of the bridge as it travels over Jones Point Park in Alexandria, Virginia

Maryland, Virginia, and federal highway officials had been confronting the problems and exploring alternatives for many years. After considerable study and public debate, officials chose a plan that would double the capacity and increase the height of the drawbridge to reduce the frequency of openings. The new bridge would include two side-by-side drawbridges with a total of 12 lanes and 70 feet (21 m) of vertical navigational clearance at the draw span. The project also included an extensive redesign and reconstruction of the Capital Beltway as it approached the new bridge from the Maryland and Virginia sides.

Construction began on the replacement facilities and approaches in 1999. Bridge construction began in October 2000 with the commencement of a dredging contract. On May 17, 2001, the Maryland State Highway Administration (MSHA) issued notice to proceed for the foundations contract. The preconstruction conference for the bridge superstructure contract was held on September 11, 2001. The events of the day, including the crash of American Airlines Flight 77 into the nearby Pentagon, caused the evacuation of the bridge foundation construction crews and disrupted the preconstruction meeting. On December 16, 2001, MSHA received only one bid (which was more than 70 percent above the engineer's estimate), and the bid was ultimately rejected. In total, the work was executed by 26 prime contractors and 260 subcontractors.

Detonation of the approach span of the old Wilson Bridge

The majority of the highway project was completed by 2009, and the upgraded Telegraph Road interchange was completed in early 2013. The Wilson Bridge project received numerous awards, including four American Road and Transportation Builders Association (ARTBA) national awards for environmental excellence, the American Society of Civil Engineers (ASCE) Outstanding Projects and Leaders (OPAL) award, the Gustav Lindenthal Award, the Marvin M. Black Excellence in Partnering award, and the ACEC Grand Award. Starting in 2001 with a Federal Highway Administration (FHWA)-approved financial plan budget of $2.44 billion (equivalent to $4.24 billion in 2025), the project completed its financial close in early 2015 at $2.36 billion (equivalent to $4.09 billion in 2025)—$86 million (equivalent to $149 million in 2025) below its original budget after more than 10 years of construction.

The first new, six-lane Potomac River bridge opened for northbound Outer Loop traffic on June 10, 2006, with only minor delays (the lane striping of the bridge and approach did not initially match up). The first car to cross was a Toyota Corolla. On July 16, 2006, at midnight, traffic from the Inner Loop of the beltway was rerouted to the future Outer Loop express lanes for two years. The original 1961 bridge was demolished at 12:35 am, on August 29, 2006, to make room for completion of the six-lane Inner Loop bridge, located between the original bridge and the new Outer Loop span. Local commuter Daniel Ruefly was given the honor of initiating the detonation after he won a contest where he was judged the driver to have suffered the most over the years from the bridge's congestion, with an estimated combined total of two and a half years spent in traffic caused by the bottleneck at the bridge. The airspace above the bridge, and the beltway in both directions, were closed for the detonation, which happened 36 minutes behind schedule. The second bridge span was dedicated on May 15, 2008, and on May 30, 2008, Inner Loop traffic was shifted onto it.

After the completion of the Wilson Bridge project, the state of Maryland and the commonwealth of Virginia became the joint owners of the completed bridge, and both states exercise joint responsibility and oversight of bridge activities, maintenance, and operations. The District of Columbia, a jurisdiction that once had ownership rights to the 1961 Wilson Bridge span, relinquished future ownership rights and responsibility for the new bridge. Additionally, DC granted a permanent easement to Maryland and Virginia for the portion of the bridge located within its boundaries.

=== Use and features ===
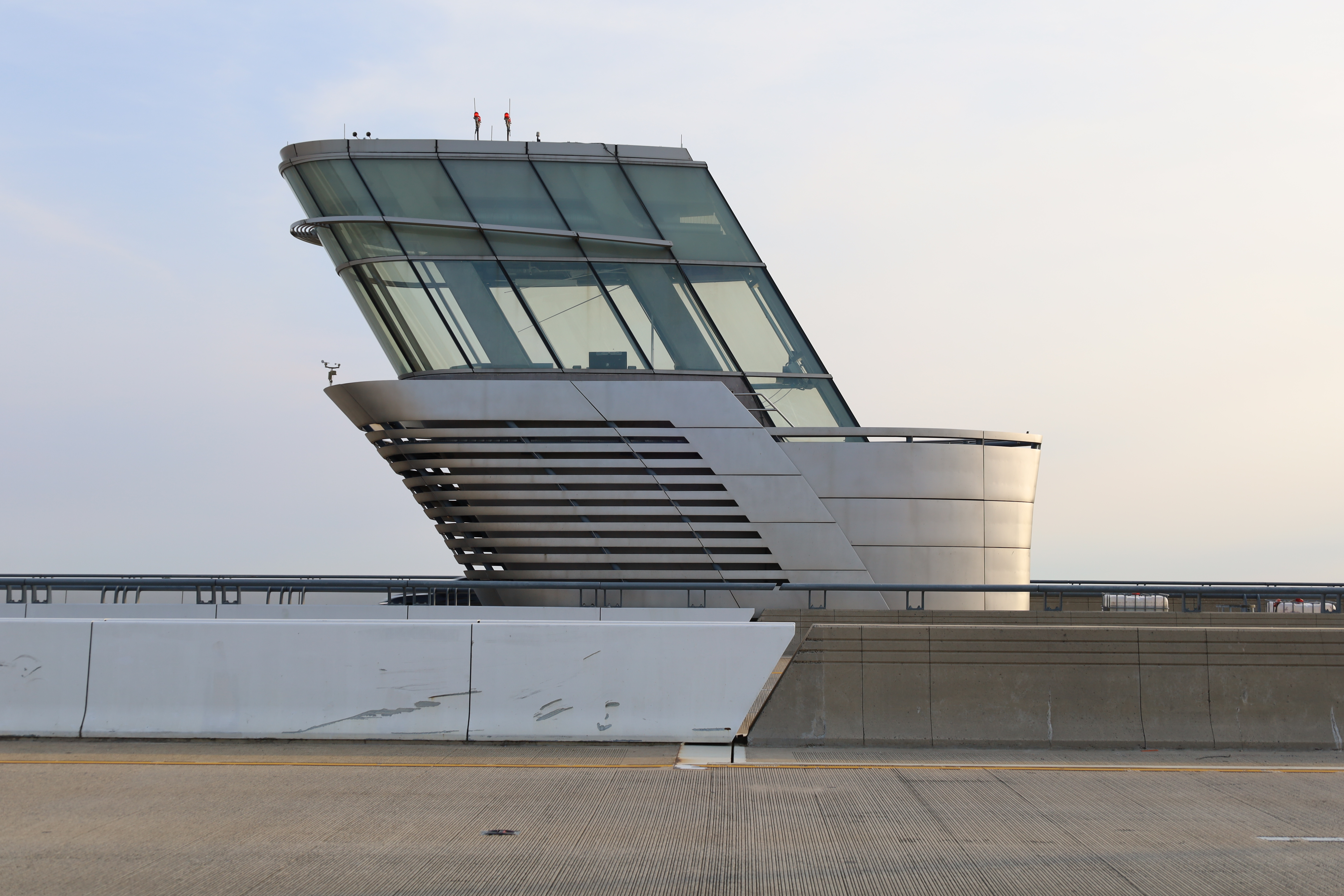
The operator's tower on the bridge. It is located in the small section within Washington DC.

Of the 12 lanes, six are used for local traffic. Four lanes, isolated from the local lanes, are used for through traffic. The bridge design allows for the remaining two lanes to be used by Washington Metro or other mass transit, though there are no current plans to do so. The consultant team for the main bridge over the Potomac River included engineers of record Parsons Transportation Group; bridge architect Miguel Rosales of Rosales + Partners; Consulting engineers were A. Morton Thomas & Associates, Inc.; Mueser Rutledge Consulting Engineers provided Geotechnical engineering; Subconsultants Finley McNary Engineers (piers); and Hardesty & Hanover, LLP (bascule span). Project management was provided by WSP USA, Rummel, Klepper & Kahl LLP, and URS Corporation.

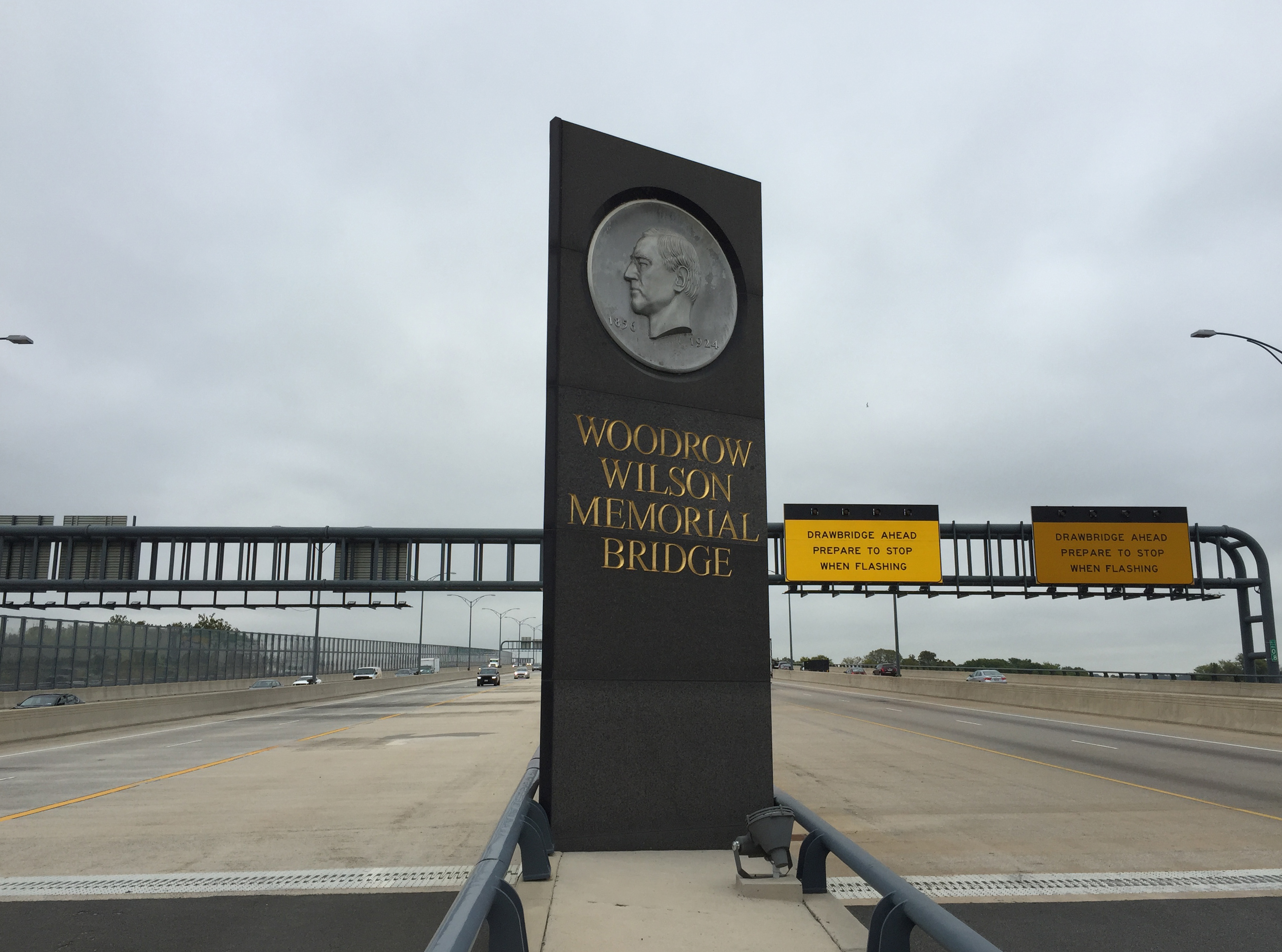
Image of Woodrow Wilson at the west (Virginia side) end of the bridge. A duplicate is located at the east end on the Maryland side.

The northern span of the bridge also includes pedestrian and bike passage, separated from traffic by safety barriers. The path, which opened on June 6, 2009, is about 12 feet (3.7 m) wide and 1.1 miles (1.8 km) long, with "bump-out" areas where users can stop to observe views of Washington and Old Town Alexandria.

The new spans are 20 feet (6.1 m) higher than the old bridge, high enough to allow most boats and small ships to pass underneath without having to raise the bridge and reducing the projected number of annual traffic-hindering openings from about 260 to about 60.

According to a draft executive summary released in December 2022 by the Virginia Department of Rail and Public Transportation for their I-495 Southside Transit/TDM study, the Woodrow Wilson Bridge has "future accommodation for potential future rail transit". An extension of the Blue Line across the bridge was also proposed at the same time.

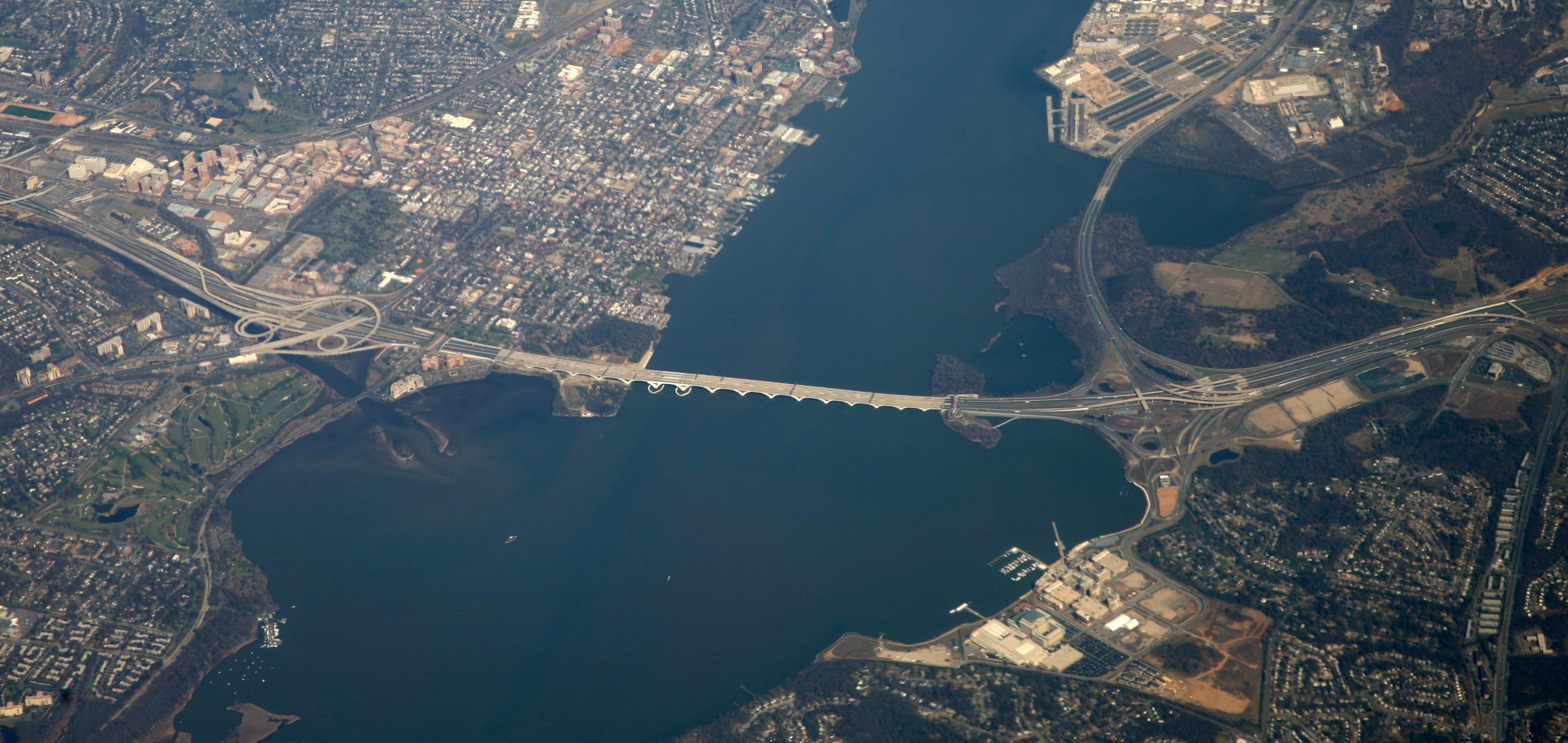
2012 aerial view of Wilson Bridge and its environs. Alexandria, Virginia, is to the left and Oxon Hill, Maryland, is to the right, with National Harbor, Maryland, at bottom right. The Blue Plains section of DC is in the upper center-right portion.

== Gallery ==
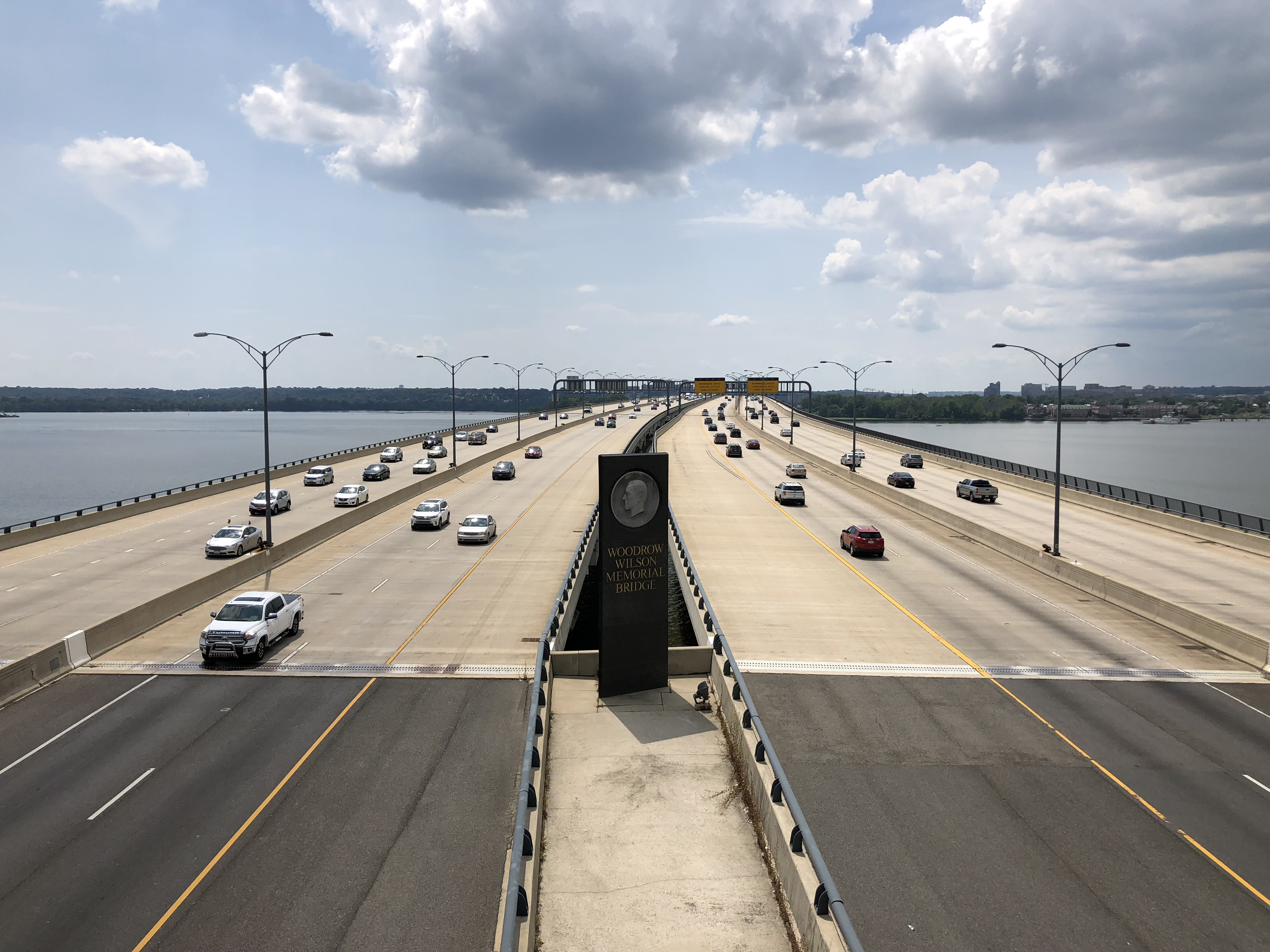
View across the bridge from the Maryland side

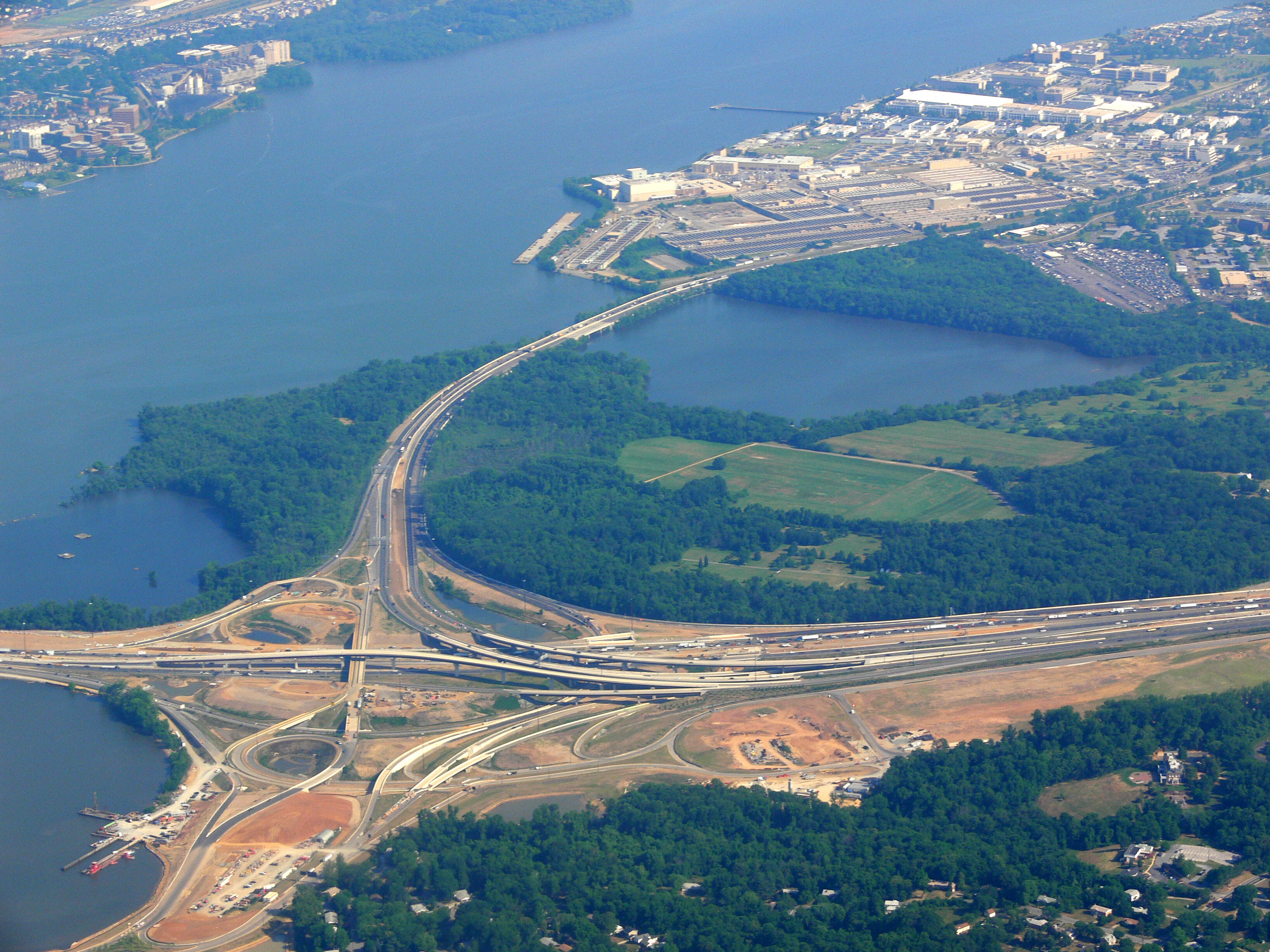
Construction of interchange on the Maryland side in 2007; the bridge is just to the left

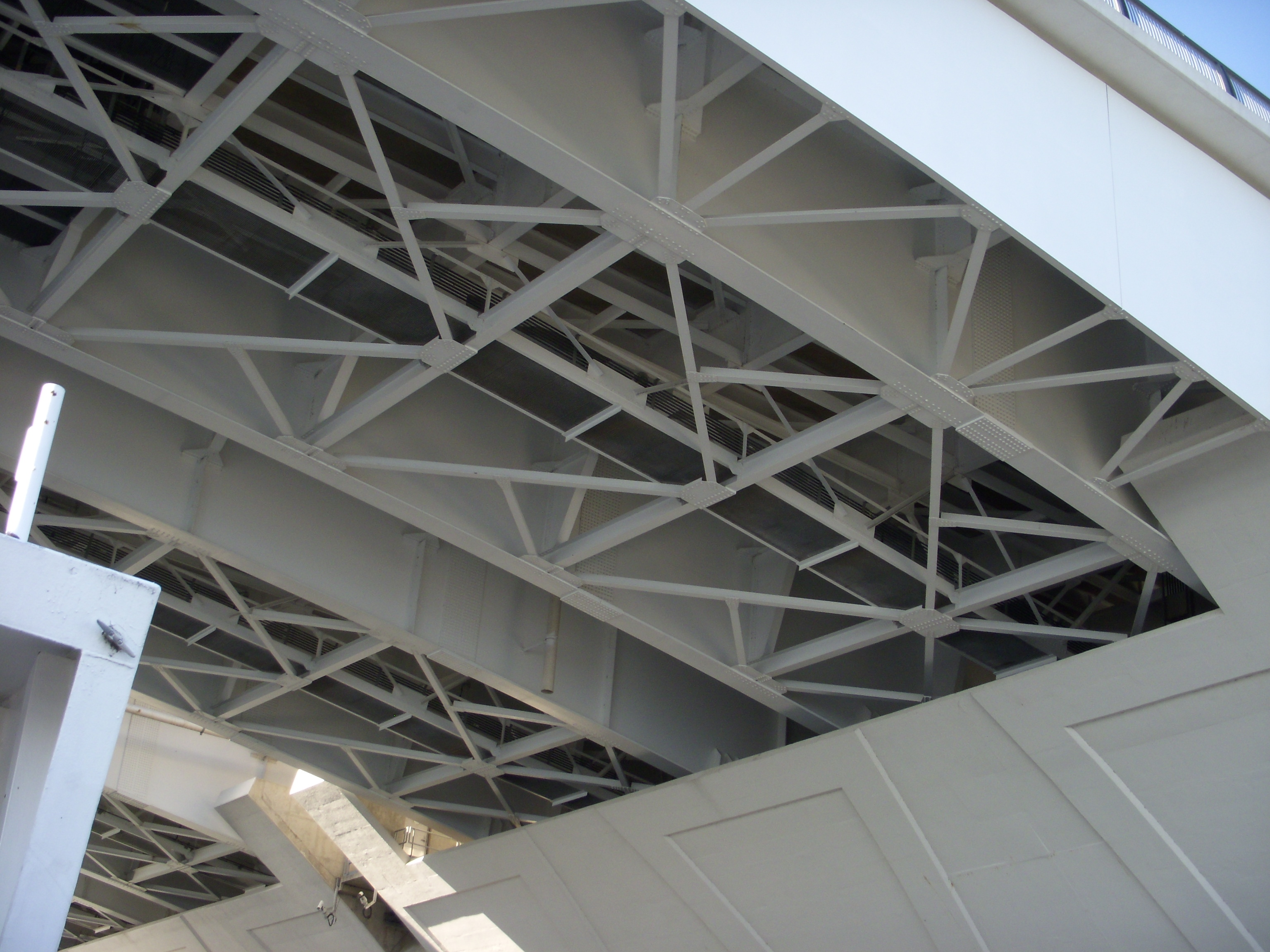
The architecture beneath the Wilson Bridge

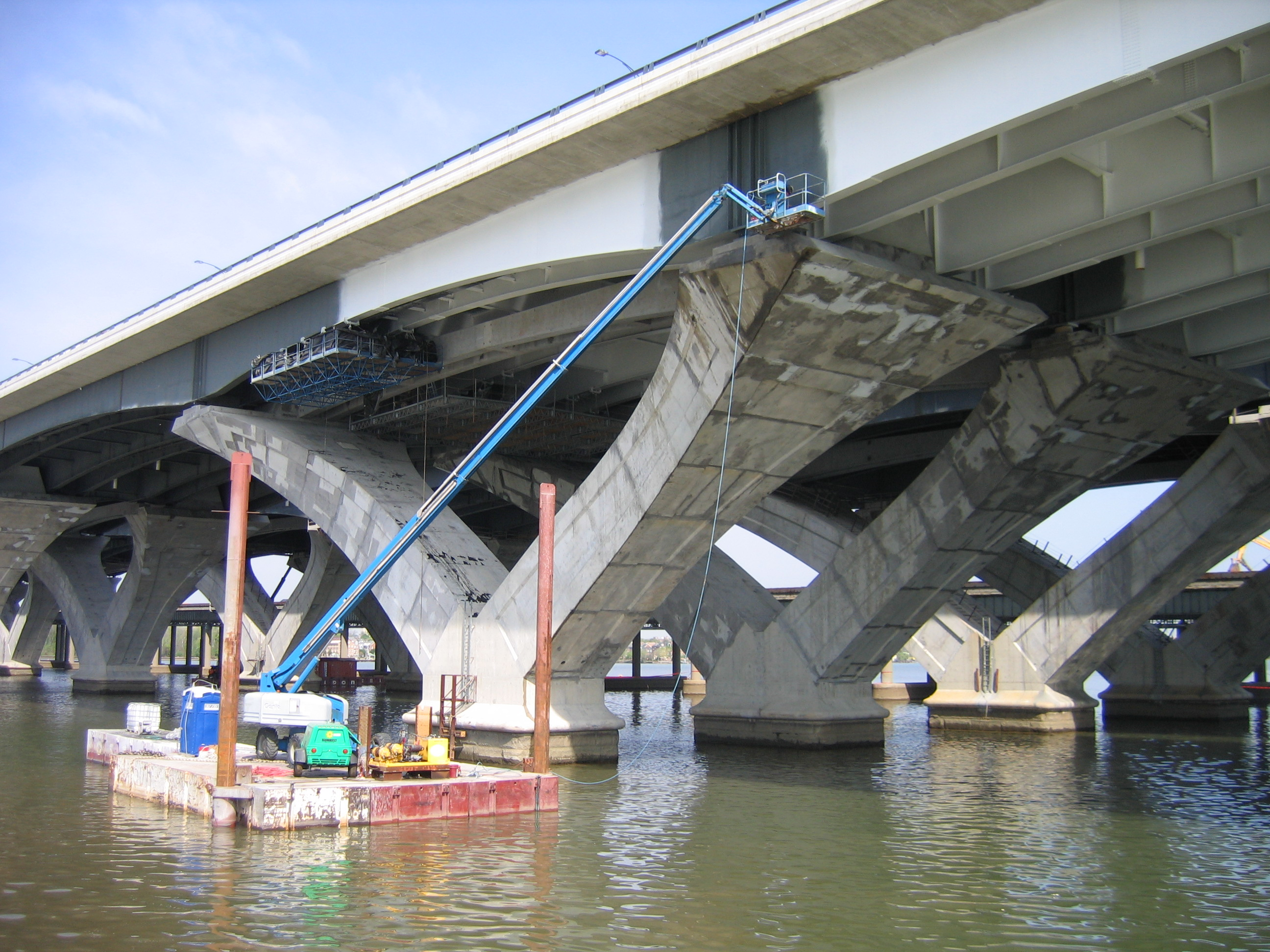
Painting application on the new span

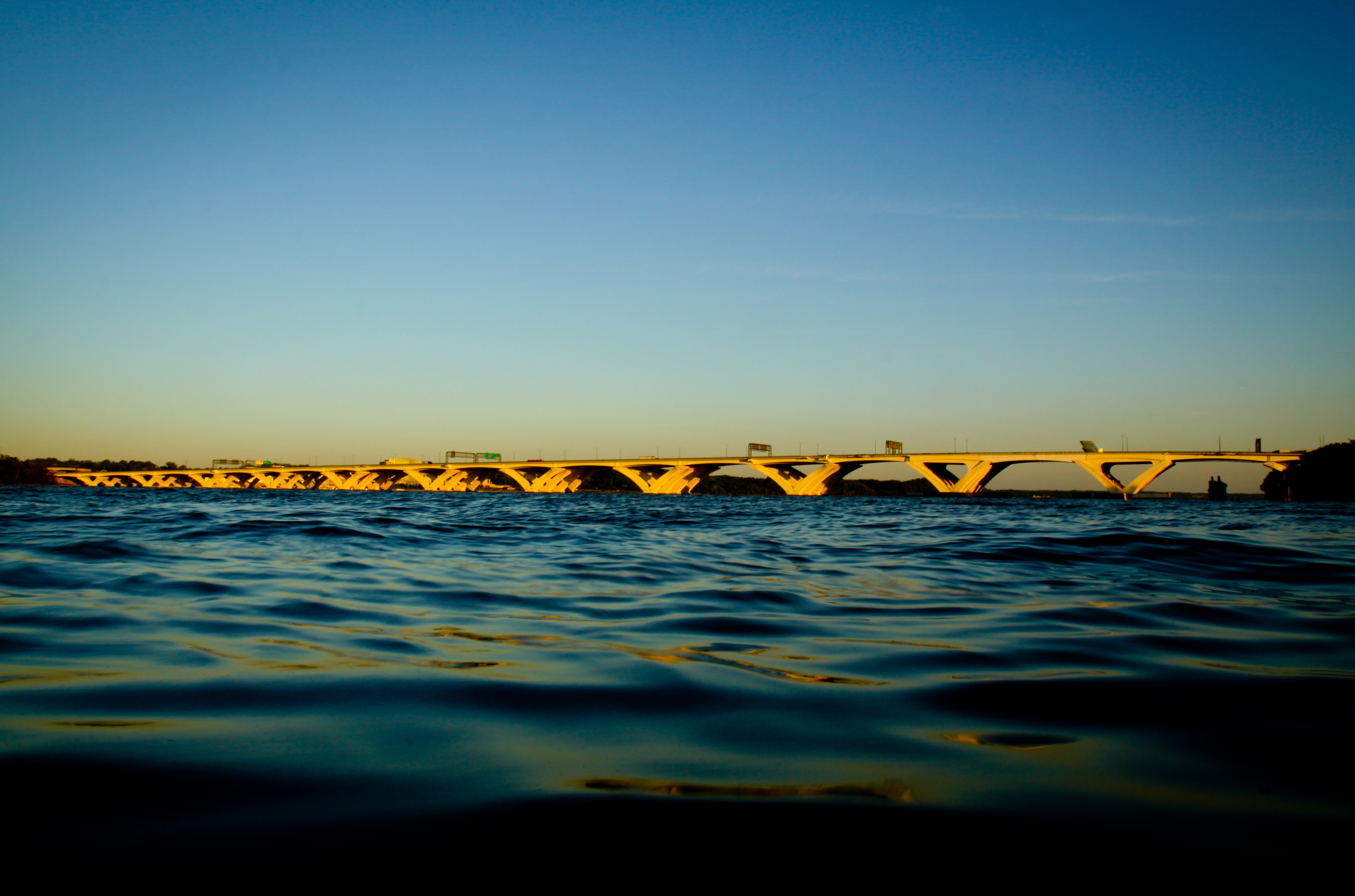
Woodrow Wilson Bridge at Sunset, as seen from Marina Park, Alexandria, Virginia

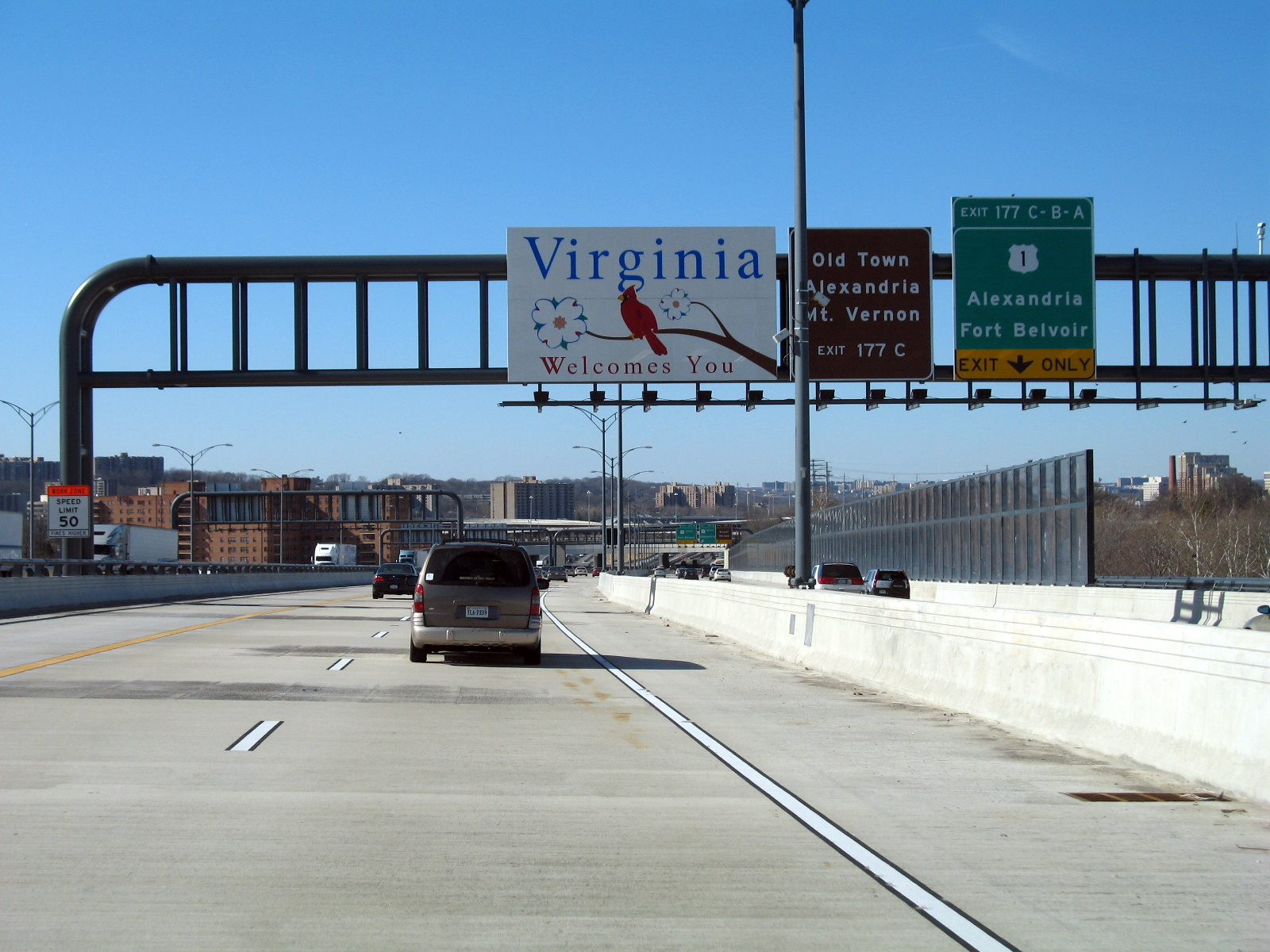
Welcome to Virginia sign on the Inner Loop over the Wilson Bridge. A short stretch of the bridge just before this sign is in DC.

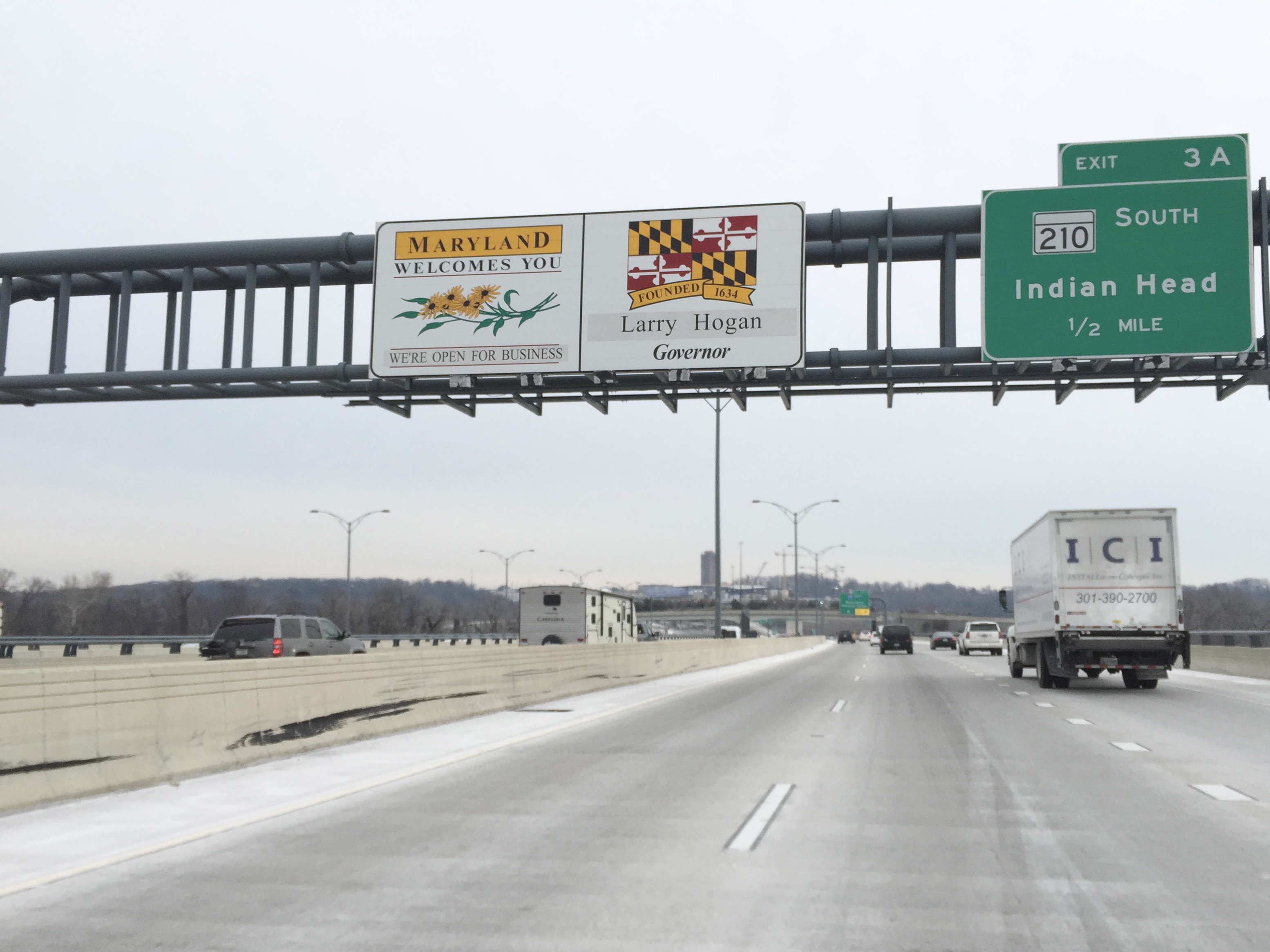
Welcome to Maryland sign on the Outer Loop over the Wilson Bridge.

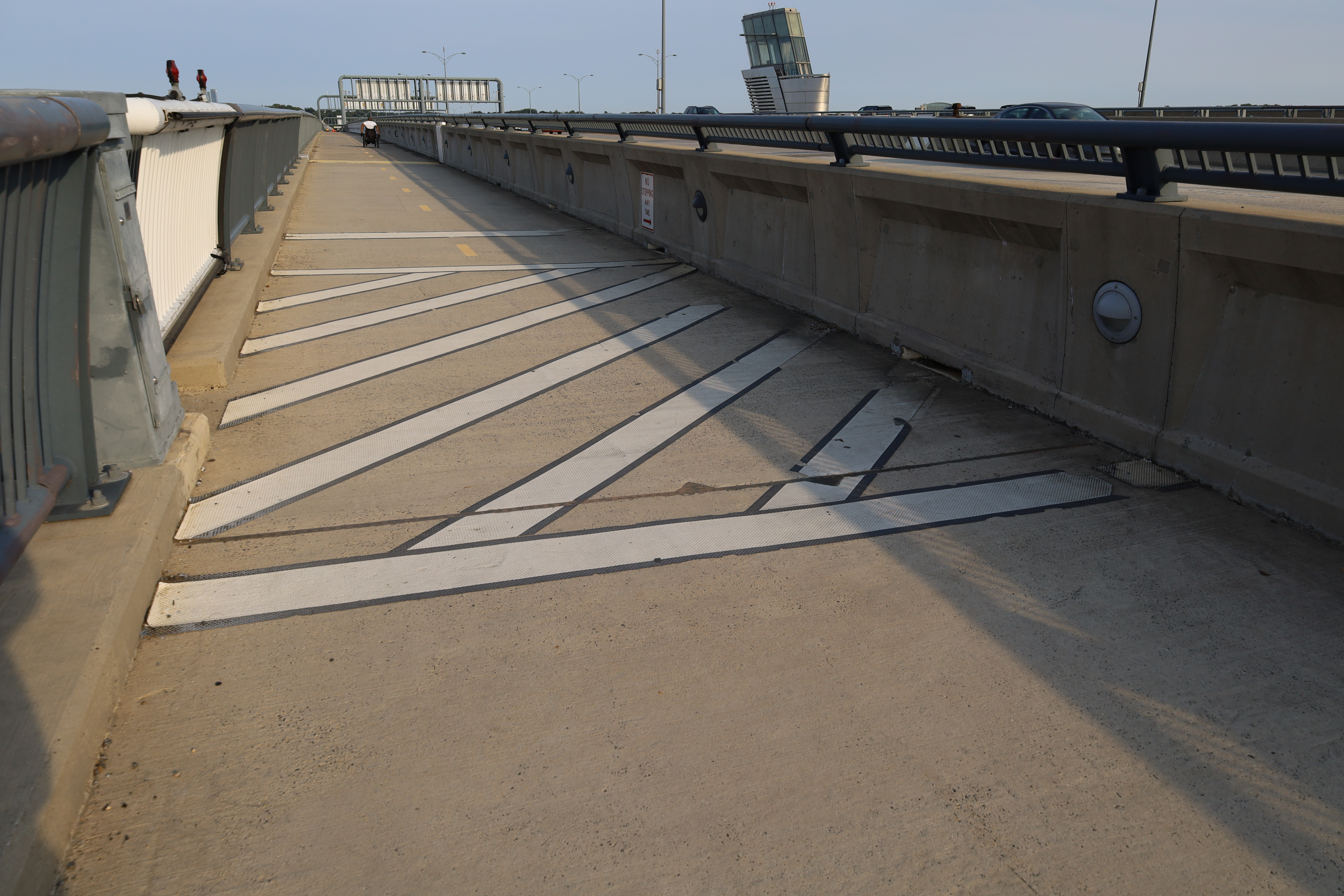
Virginia–DC border marked on the bridge

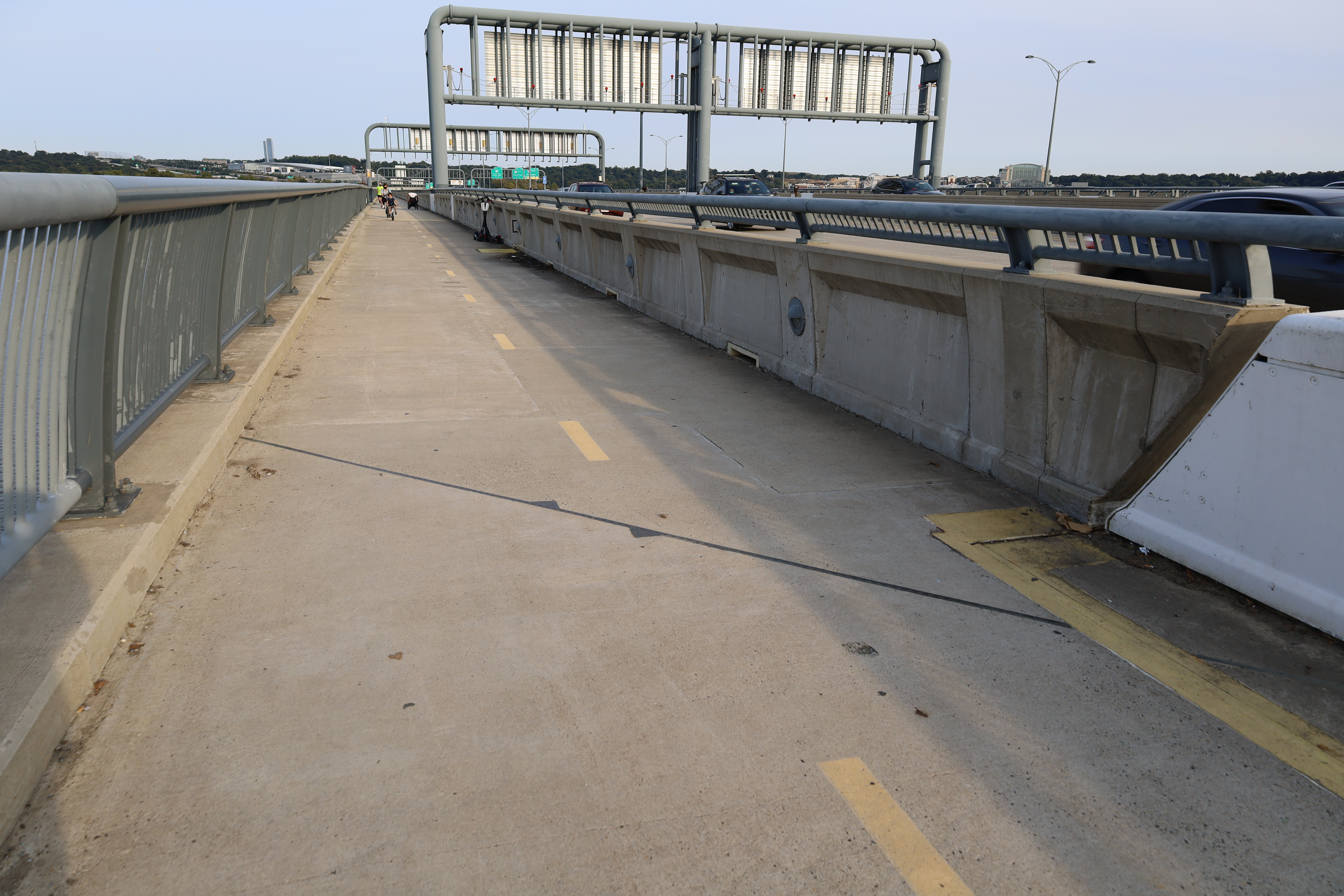
DC–Maryland border marked on the bridge

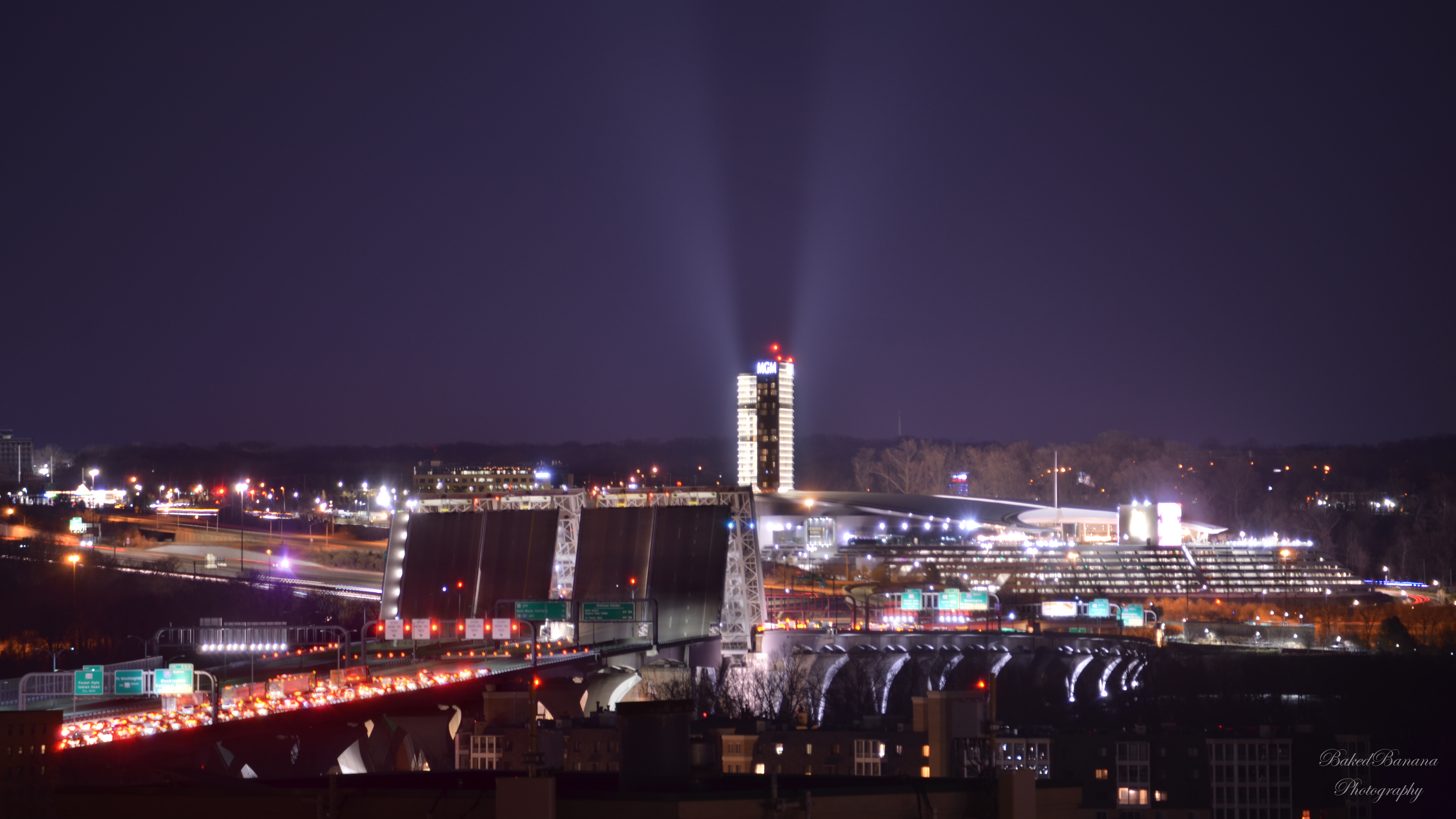
The Wilson Bridge open for the passing of a vessel, as seen from Alexandria, Virginia

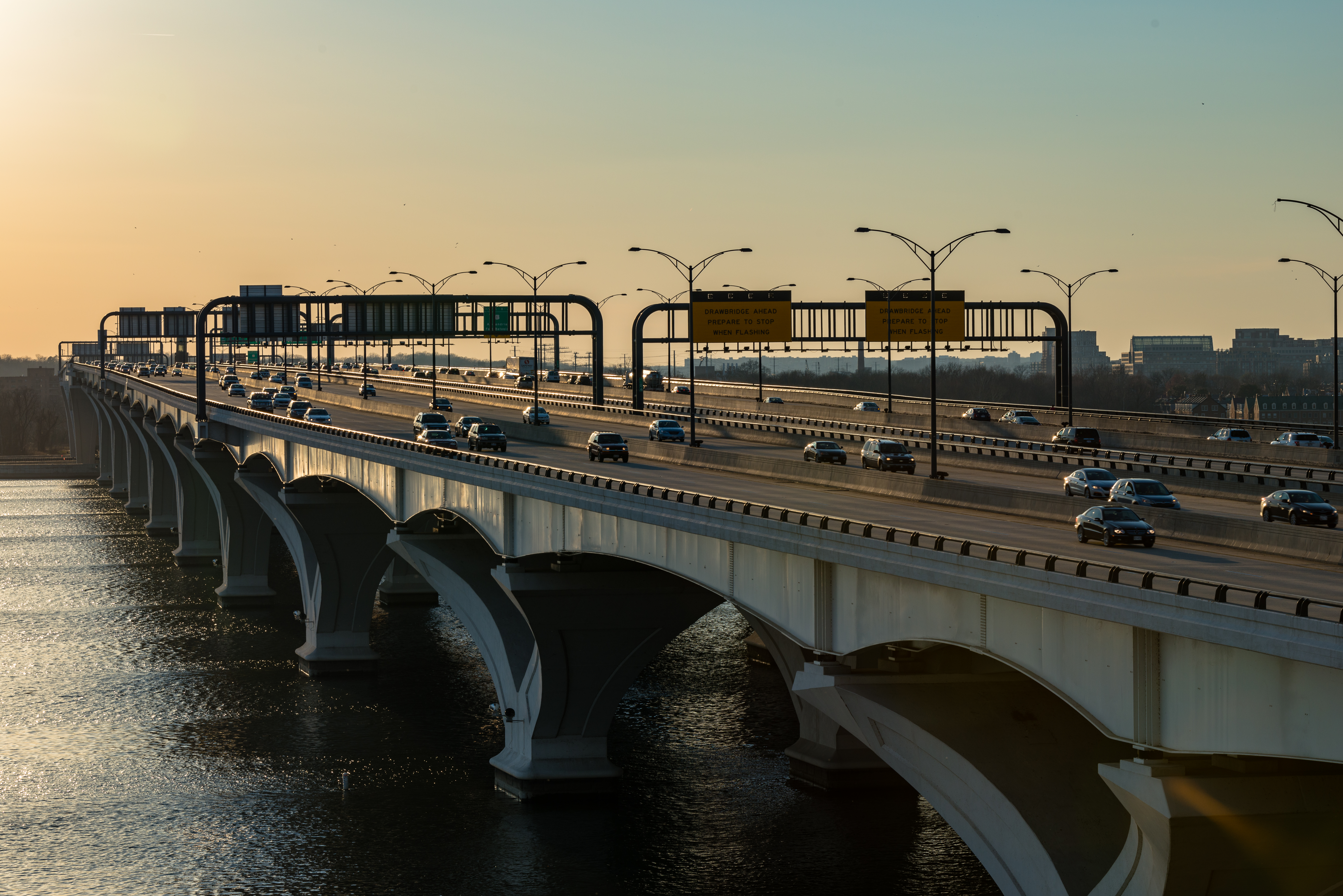
Traffic flowing across the Woodrow Wilson Bridge

== See also ==
- CTI Consultants
- List of crossings of the Potomac River

Browse numbered routes
← I-66	DC	→ I-295
← MD 94	MD	→ I-97
← SR 94	VA	→ SR 96

Interstate 95
Previous state: Virginia	District of Columbia	Next state: Maryland
