= CTI Consultants =

Engineering consulting firm in Richmond, Virginia

CTI Consultants, Inc. (CTI; rebranded as Stevenson Consulting) is an American engineering consulting firm founded in 1984.

== Overview ==
Its corporate headquarters is located in Richmond, Virginia, along with branch offices at eight other locations in the Mid-Atlantic Region of the United States: Baltimore, Maryland, Rockville, Maryland, Chantilly, Virginia, Ashland, Virginia, Charlottesville, Virginia, Winchester, Virginia, Norfolk, Virginia, Blacksburg, Virginia, and Raleigh, North Carolina.

Projects undertaken include: bridges, highways, new buildings, additions, renovations, historical renovations, and associated infrastructure.

== History ==
CTI was founded by Chris Stevenson in Fairfax, Virginia in 1984. As of 2017, Chris Stevenson is the company's CEO. His son, Colin Stevenson, is the company's president. In 1996, the company acquired the geotechnical engineering division of Hatcher-Sayre, Inc.

In 2008, CTI began working on federal government projects on military bases. In June 2017, the company acquired Mosher Engineering.

CTI has been recognized in the Mid-Atlantic Engineering Industry via the Washington Business Journal's annual list of “Top 25 Engineering Firms” for the Washington Metropolitan Area.

CTI is a contract holder for the Virginia Department of General Services.

Notable projects include: the Woodrow Wilson Bridge Expansion, The Westin Virginia Beach Town Center, the I-495 Hotlanes Expansion, United States Institute of Peace Headquarters, Square 54 Redevelopment, and the HRT Norfolk Tide Light Rail.
