= Square 54 Redevelopment =

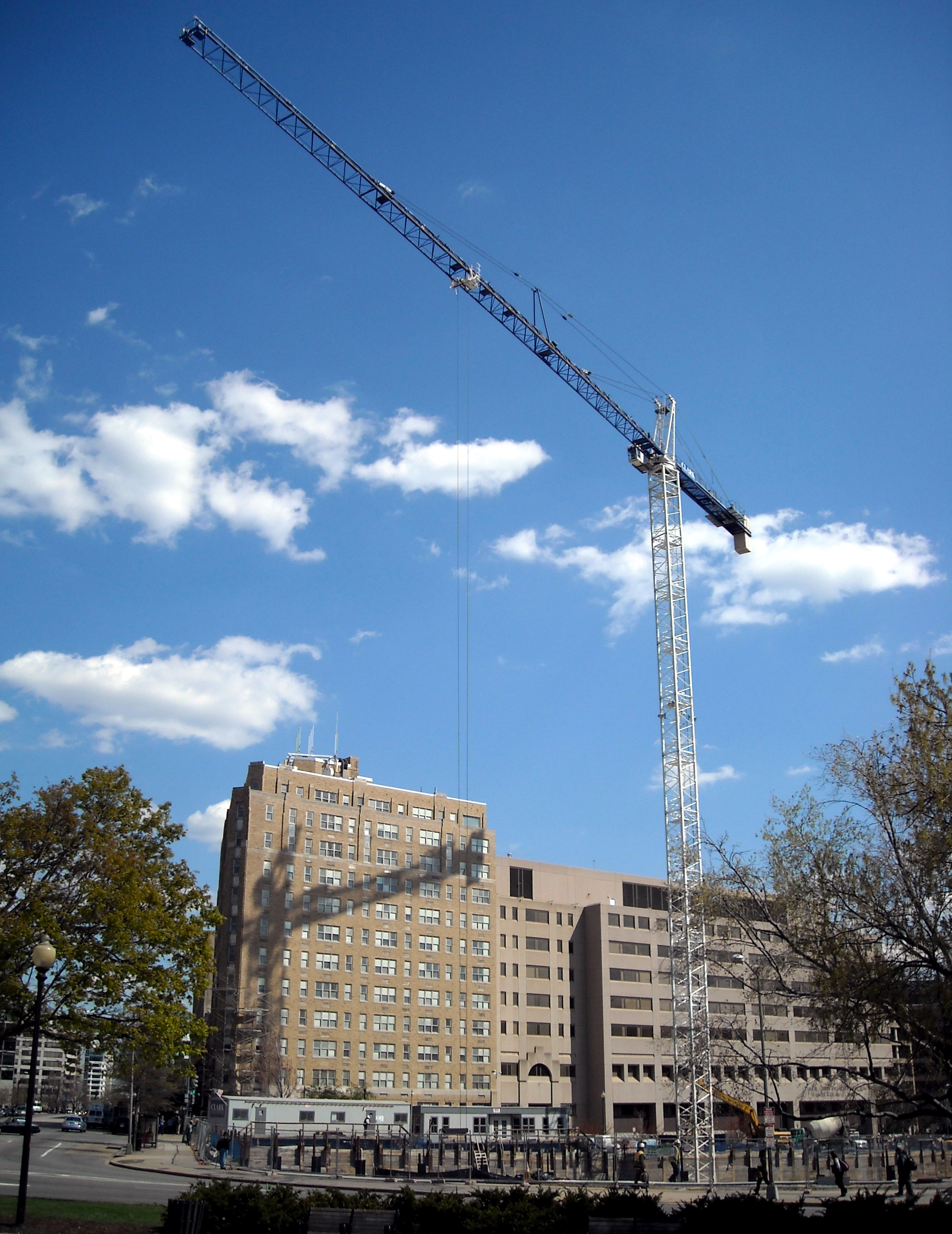
- A tower crane operating at the Square 54 site. April 2009.
- Interactive map of the Square 54 Redevelopment area

General information
- Location: The George Washington University; Washington, D.C., United States
- Coordinates: 38°54′5″N 77°2′58″W
- Estimated completion: 2011

Design and construction
- Architect: Pelli Clarke Pelli Architects

Square 54 Redevelopment is a complex of high-rise buildings located on the main campus of The George Washington University (GW) in Washington, D.C., United States. The new GW complex is mixed-use, with residential and office buildings and ground-level retail space along Eye Street to serve the campus and neighborhood. The complex will be completed with three buildings, Square 54 Residential I, Square 54 Residential II, and Square 54 Office. Square 54 Residential I is expected to rise 157 feet (48 m), featuring 14 floors. Square 54 Residential II is expected to rise 144 feet (44 m), featuring 12 floors. Finally, Square 54 Office, is expected to rise 148 feet (45 m), featuring 11 floors. Construction of every building will be completed in 2011. Each building will be designed by the architect, Pelli Clarke Pelli Architects and Hickok Cole Architects. The complex will replace the former George Washington University Hospital building, which was razed to make way for the construction of the Square 54 Complex.

== See also ==
- CTI Consultants
- List of tallest buildings in Washington, D.C.
