= Haynes (surname) =

Origin
- Region of origin: England (Bedfordshire, Merseyside, and Cheshire), Wales, Scotland (Highlands, Aberdeenshire, and Banffshire)

Other names
- Variant forms: Haine, Hayne, Haines, Hains, Hanes, and Haynes

Haynes is a surname.

== Etymology ==
According to the Oxford Dictionary of Family Names in Britain and Ireland, the modern names Haine, Hayne, Haines, Hains, Hanes, and Haynes originate in four different medieval names, which came to sound the same.

1. The Middle English name Hain. This is thought to have originated as a pet form of Anglo-Norman names such as Reynald, Reyner and Rainbert.
2. The personal name Hagan, which is itself of diverse origins.
3. The Old English word haga ('enclosure', Middle English hay), in the oblique case form hagan (Middle English hayne), whose use could have arisen from a locative epithet such as æt hagan ('at the enclosure').

The forms ending in -s show the addition of the genitive case ending, implying that the name-bearer was the child of a father called Hain, or addition of -s on the analogy of such named.

Additional etymologies for Haines and Haynes names not shared by the Hayne types are:

1. the place-name of Haynes, Bedfordshire, indicating people from that village (whose name itself derived from Old English *hægen ('enclosures').
2. the Irish name Hynes.

The Oxford Dictionary of Family Names in Britain and Ireland also considers the suggestion of origins in the Welsh name Einws (a pet form of Einion), but does not find evidence to support this.

== Distribution ==
As of around 2011, 15,237 individuals had the surname Haynes in Great Britain, and 110 in Ireland. In 1881, 10,446 people in Great Britain had the name, which was widespread in England, with a cluster in the Midlands. Meanwhile, Irish bearers of the name around the middle of the nineteenth century clustered in Cork.

As a surname, Haynes is the 249th most common surname in Great Britain with 33,812 bearers. It is most common in the West Midlands where it is the 89th most common surname with 4,937 bearers. Other concentrations include East Sussex, (17th, 3,323), Cambridgeshire, (32nd, 3,357), Hampshire, (84th, 3,385), Tyne & Wear, (192nd, 1,821), West Yorkshire, (280th, 1,739), Cheshire, (282nd, 1,715) and Essex (461st, 1,703). Other notable concentrations include, Gwynedd, Merseyside, Bedfordshire, Oxfordshire, Northamptonshire, and Greater London.

== People ==
Notable people with the surname include:

=== A ===
- Abner Haynes (1937–2024), American football player
- Adrian Haynes (1926–1988), Native American leader
- Akeem Haynes (born 1992), Canadian sprinter
- Al Haynes (1931–2019), American airline pilot
- Alan Haynes (born 1956), American blues guitarist
- Alex Haynes (born 1982), American football player
- Alf Haynes (1907–1953), English football player
- Allegra "Happy" Haynes (born 1953), American politician and consultant
- Alvin Haynes (born 1968), Barbadian athlete
- Alwyn Sidney Haynes (1878–1963), British colonial administrator and agriculturalist
- Angela Haynes (born 1984), American tennis player
- Anita Haynes, Trinidad and Tobago politician
- Anna Jo Garcia Haynes (born 1934), American educator
- Annie Haynes (1864–1929), British mystery writer
- Arden Haynes (1927–2017), Canadian businessman and university administrator
- Arthur Haynes (1914–1966), English comedian
- Asbury F. Haynes (1842–1931), Union Army soldier
- Austin Haynes (actor) (born 2008), British actor
- Austin Haynes (politician) (born 1997), American politician and businessman

=== B ===
- Barton Haynes, American physician and research scientist
- Ben Haynes (born 1981), Australian rules footballer
- Benjamin Franklin Haynes (1851–1923), American minister and theologian
- Bertram Haynes (born 1968), Saint Kitts and Nevis athlete
- Betsy Haynes, American author
- Billy Jack Haynes (born 1953), American professional wrestler
- Brian Haynes (footballer) (born 1962), Trinidadian football player and coach
- Brian Haynes (canoeist) (1951–2011), British sprint canoer
- Bruce Haynes (1942–2011), American and Canadian oboist and musicologist
- Bruce Haynes (consultant), American communications consultant

=== C ===
- Caleb V. Haynes (1895–1966), U.S. Air Force major general
- Carleton Haynes (1858–1945), English cricketer
- Carol Lady Haynes, Jamaican-Barbadian doctor and politician
- Caroline Coventry Haynes (1858–1951), American bryologist and painter
- Catharina Haynes (born 1963), American judge
- Chanel Haynes (born 1978), American singer-songwriter and actress
- Charles Haynes (footballer) (1855–1935), British army officer and footballer
- Charles Lyman Haynes (1870–1947), American architect
- Charles E. Haynes (1784–1841), American politician and physician
- Cheyenne Haynes, American actress
- Christian Haynes (born 2000), American college football player
- Christy Haynes (born 1977), American chemist
- Crystal Haynes, Barbadian politician and medical doctor
- Clarity Haynes, American artist and writer
- Colton Haynes (born 1988), American actor
- Cornell Haynes Jr., stage name Nelly (born 1974), American rapper
- Cyril Haynes (1915–1996), American jazz pianist and arranger

=== D ===
- D. E. L. Haynes (1913–1994), English classical scholar, archaeologist and curator
- Daniel L. Haynes (1889–1954), American actor and cleric
- Danny Haynes (born 1988), English footballer
- Darren M. Haynes (born 1981), American television sports anchor
- David Haynes (born 1981), Australian rules footballer
- David Haynes (novelist), American novelist
- DeAndre Haynes (born 1984), American assistant basketball coach
- Deborah Haynes (born 1976), British journalist
- Denis Haynes (1923–2012), English cricketer
- Desmond Haynes (born 1956), Barbadian cricketer and cricket coach
- Dick Haynes (1911–1980), American actor
- Dorothy K. Haynes (1918–1987), Scottish horror and supernatural writer
- Douglas Haynes (1936–2016), Canadian abstract artist
- Douglas Haynes (cricketer) (born 1953), Vincentian cricketer

=== E ===
- E. Paul Haynes (1918–1988), bishop of the Episcopal Diocese of Southwest Florida
- E. S. P. Haynes (1877–1949), British lawyer and writer
- Edgar Haynes (1866–1923), American Christian evangelist
- Edward Haynes (fl.1683–1708), English astronomer
- Eldridge Haynes (1904–1976), American publisher and business executive
- Elizabeth Haynes (crime writer), British writer of crime fiction
- Elizabeth Ross Haynes (1883–1953), African American social worker, sociologist, and author
- Elizabeth Sterling Haynes (1897–1957), Canadian theatre activist
- Elwood Haynes (1857–1925), American inventor and co-founder of the Haynes-Apperson Company
- Esco Haynes, American baseball player
- Esther Helton-Haynes (born 1961), American politician
- Eugene Haynes (1927–2007), American classical pianist, composer and music educator
- Euphemia Haynes (1890–1980), African American mathematician and educator

=== F ===
- Frank Haynes (musician) (1928–1965), American jazz saxophonist
- Frank Haynes (politician) (1926–1998), British politician
- Frank Jay Haynes (1853–1921), American professional photographer, publisher and entrepreneur
- Fred Haynes (born c.1952), British-born Canadian politician
- Fred E. Haynes Jr. (1921–2010), United States Marine Corps major general
- Frederick Haynes (artist) (1832–1897), British painter
- Frederick Haynes III (born 1960), American pastor and politician

=== G ===
- Garth Haynes, American tennis player
- Gavin Haynes (born 1969), English cricketer
- George Haynes (businessman) (1745–1830), British entrepreneur, pottery manufacturer, banker and newspaper proprietor
- George Haynes (footballer) (1865–1937), English footballer
- George Edmund Haynes (1880–1960), American sociologist and functionary
- Gibby Haynes (born 1957), American musician
- Glenn Haynes (born 1960), Brazilian competitive sailor
- Gordon Haynes (1928–2015), English rugby league footballer
- Gordon Haynes (curler) (1918–2004), Canadian curler
- Grace Lynne Haynes, American artist
- Graham Haynes (born 1960), American cornetist, trumpeter and composer

=== H ===
- Hall Haynes (1928–1988), American football player
- Hamish Haynes (born 1974), English road racing cyclist
- Harry Haynes (1873–1902), English footballer
- Heath Haynes (born 1968), American baseball player
- Henry Haynes (cricketer) (1834–1892), Barbadian cricketer
- Henry Botting Haynes (1870–1942), Australian Anglican priest
- Henry D. "Homer" Haynes (1920–1971), American comedy entertainer and musician
- Henry Williamson Haynes (1831–1912), American archaeologist
- Hezekiah Haynes (died 1693), British parliamentarian army officer
- Hopton Haynes (1667–1749), English employee of the Royal Mint and theological writer
- Hunter Haynes (1867–1918), American barber, entrepreneur and inventor

=== I ===
- Inez Haynes (1909–1997), director of the United States Army Nurse Corps
- Ira Allen Haynes (1859–1955), United States Army officer
- Irving B. Haynes (1927–2005), American architect and preservationist
- Isabel Haynes (1899–1993), American businesswoman

=== J ===
- Jack Haynes (born 2001), English cricketer
- Jack Ellis Haynes (1884–1962), American photographer
- Jah Jerry Haynes (1921–2007), Jamaican guitarist
- Jamal Haynes (born 2002), American football player
- James Haynes (American football) (born 1960), American football player
- James Haynes (cricketer) (born 1972), English cricketer
- Jamie Haynes (born 1974), English cricketer
- Jason Haynes (cricketer) (born 1981), Barbadian cricketer
- J. C. Haynes (1848–1913), American lawyer and politician
- Jeffrey Haynes, stage name Mr. Lif (born 1977), American rapper
- Jerry Haynes (1927–2011), American actor and children's television host
- Jim Haynes (1933–2021), American counterculture figure in the United Kingdom
- Jim Haynes (writer) (born 1946), Australian entertainer, bush poet, historian and songwriter
- Jimmy Haynes (born 1972), American baseball player
- J. Manchester Haynes (1839–1906), American businessperson, lawyer and politician
- Joe Haynes (baseball) (1917–1967), American baseball player
- Joe M. Haynes (1936–2018), American lawyer and politician
- John Haynes (draughtsman) (fl.1730–1750), British draughtsman and engraver
- John Haynes (governor) (1594–1653/54), colonial governor of Massachusetts and Connecticut
- John Haynes (journalist) (1850–1917), Australian journalist and politician
- John Haynes Jr. (1937–2021), American physician
- John Carmichael Haynes (1831–1888), Irish-born rancher, judge and public servant in British Columbia
- John-Dylan Haynes (born 1971), British-German brain researcher
- John Earl Haynes (born 1944), American historian
- John Henry Haynes (1849–1910), American traveller, archaeologist, and photographer
- John L. Haynes (1821–1888), American soldier and politician
- John Randolph Haynes (1853–1937), California socialist
- Johnny Haynes (1934–2005), English football player
- Jonathan Preston Haynes (born 1958), American murderer
- Jordan Haynes (born 1996), Canadian soccer player
- Joseph Haynes (painter) (1760–1829), English etcher and engraver
- Joseph E. Haynes (1827–1897), mayor of Newark, New Jersey
- Josh Haynes (born 1977), American mixed martial artist
- Josh Haynes (cricketer) (born 1999), English cricketer, son of Gavin Haynes
- Justice Haynes (born 2004), American football player

=== K ===
- Karen S. Haynes (born 1946), American academic and college administrator
- Karmella Haynes, American biomedical engineer
- Keith E. Haynes (born 1963), American politician and lawyer
- Kenny Haynes, American basketball player
- Kiki Haynes (born 1976), American actress
- Krista Haynes (born 1991), Canadian player of American football
- Kristian Haynes (born 1980), Swedish football player and manager
- Kyle Haynes (born 1991), English footballer

=== L ===
- Landon Carter Haynes (1816–1875), American politician
- Larry Haynes (1911–1994), Canadian football player and coach
- Lauren Haynes, American museum curator
- Lauren Haynes (footballer) (born 1995), English footballer
- Lemuel Haynes (1753–1833), American preacher and abolitionist
- Leroy Haynes (1914–1986), American restaurateur and actor
- Linda Haynes (1947–2023), American actress
- Linda Haynes (businesswoman), Canadian businessperson and philanthropist
- Lloyd Haynes (1934–1986), American actor
- Lorenza Haynes (1820–1899), American librarian, minister, suffragist and writer
- Louis Haynes (1960–2002), American football player
- Loyal M. Haynes (1895–1974), United States Army brigadier general

=== M ===
- Manning Haynes (died 1957), British film director
- Marc Haynes (born 1976), English comedy writer, radio broadcaster and podcaster
- March Haynes (1825–1899), African American abolitionist
- Marcus Haynes (born 1998), American football player
- Mark Haynes (born 1958), American football player
- Marques Haynes (1926–2015), American basketball player
- MarQuez Haynes (born 1986), American-Georgian basketball player
- Marquis Haynes (born 1993), American football player
- Martha P. Haynes (born 1951), American astronomer
- Martin A. Haynes (1842–1919), US Representative
- Matthew Haynes (born 1984), British track cyclist
- Melinda Haynes (born 1955), American novelist
- Melton Haynes (1827–1883), American Confederate Army soldier and civil engineer
- Michael Haynes (cricketer) (1936–1997), English cricketer
- Michael Haynes (defensive lineman) (born 1980), American football player
- Michael Haynes (wide receiver) (born 1965), American football player
- Michael Haynes III known as Prince Iaukea (born 1964), American professional wrestler
- Michael E. Haynes (1927–2019), American Baptist minister and politician
- Mike Haynes (cornerback) (born 1953), American football player
- Mike Haynes (ice hockey), American sports broadcaster
- Mitzi Haynes (1918–2004), American actress and showgirl

=== N ===
- Nancy Haynes (born 1947), American painter
- Natalie Haynes (born 1974), English classicist, writer, broadcaster and comedian
- Nathan Haynes (born 1979), American baseball player
- Nick Haynes (born 1992), Australian rules footballer
- Nicole Haynes (born 1974), Canadian-American heptathlete
- Nola Anderson Haynes (1897–1996), American mathematician

=== P ===
- Paul Haynes (American football) (born 1969), American college football coach
- Paul Haynes (basketball) (born 1982), American basketball player
- Paul Haynes (ice hockey) (1910–1989), Canadian ice hockey player
- Percy Haynes (1911–1992), Canadian musician
- Peter Haynes (priest) (1925–2018), British Anglican priest
- Peter H. Haynes (born 1958), British applied mathematician
- Phil Haynes (born 1961), American jazz percussionist and composer
- Phil Haynes (American football) (born 1995), American football player

=== R ===
- Rachael Haynes (born 1986), Australian cricketer
- Rainey Haynes (born 1964), American rock singer and writer
- Ray Haynes (born 1954), American politician
- Ray Haynes (footballer) (born 1947), Australian rules footballer
- Rebecca Haynes (born 1984), Australian basketball player
- Reggie Haynes (born 1954), American football player
- Renée Haynes (1906–1992), English writer, historian and psychical researcher
- Renson Haynes (born 1978), Vincentian football player and manager
- Richard Haynes (cricketer) (1913–1976), English cricketer
- Richard Haynes (lawyer) (1927–2017), American defense attorney
- Richard Haynes (musician) (born 1983), Australian clarinettist
- Richard Christopher Haynes (1936–2013), Barbadian politician and surgeon
- Richard Septimus Haynes (1857–1922), Australian barrister and politician
- Robert Haynes (geneticist) (1931–1998), Canadian geneticist and biophysicist
- Robert Brian Haynes, Canadian physician, clinical epidemiologist, and academic
- Robert Haynes (cricketer) (born 1964), West Indian cricketer
- Roberta Haynes (1927–2019), American actress
- Rocco Haynes (born 2013), British actor
- Roy Haynes (1926–2024), American jazz musician
- Roy Haynes (designer) (1924–2020), British automobile designer
- Roy Asa Haynes (1881–1940), American newspaper editor and government official
- Ryan Haynes (footballer) (born 1995), English footballer
- Ryan A. Haynes (born 1985), American politician

=== S ===
- Sammy Haynes (1920–1997), American baseball player
- Samuel Alfred Haynes (1899–1971), Belizean soldier, activist and poet
- Samuel Johnson Haynes (1852–1932), Australian barrister and politician
- Samuel Haynes (historian) (died 1752), English cleric and author
- Sarah D. Allen Oren Haynes (1836–1907), American librarian, mathematician and botanist
- Simon Haynes, Australian writer of speculative fiction
- Simon Haynes (priest) (died 1552), English cleric and diplomat
- Stanley Haynes, Anglican bishop in South Africa
- Stanley Haynes (producer) (1906–1958), British film producer and screenwriter
- Stephanie Haynes (died 2015), American jazz singer
- Stephen Haynes (1801–1879), American politician, builder and businessman
- Susan Haynes, American country music artist
- Susan B. Haynes (born 1959), American Episcopal bishop
- S. Wesley Haynes (1892–1983), American architect
- Sybille Haynes (born 1926), British archaeologist

=== T ===
- Terrence Haynes (born 1984), Barbadian freestyle swimmer
- Thelma Griffith Haynes (1913–1995), Canadian–American baseball club owner
- Teresa W. Haynes (born 1953), American mathematician
- Tiger Haynes (1914–1994), American actor
- Toby Haynes, British television director
- Todd Haynes (born 1961), American film director
- Thomas J. Haynes, United States Air Force officer
- Thomas Haynes (burgess), member of the Virginia House of Burgesses
- Tom Haynes (born 1997), English cricketer
- Tommy Haynes (born 1952), American athlete
- Tommy Haynes (American football) (born 1963), American football player
- Tony Haynes (English composer) (born 1941), English composer
- Tony Haynes (American musician), American songwriter, poet and author
- Trae Bell-Haynes (born 1995), Canadian basketball player
- Trevor Haynes (born 1929), Northern Rhodesian and Zambian runner
- Trevor Haynes (businessman), Australian businessman
- Trudy Haynes (1926–2022), American journalist

=== U ===
- Ulric Haynes (1931–2020), American diplomat, lawyer and academic

=== V ===
- Vance Haynes (born 1928), American archaeologist, geologist and author
- Vernon Haynes (1910–1973), American football and basketball player and coach
- Verron Haynes (born 1979), Trinidadian American football player

=== W ===
- Walter Haynes (1928–2009), American steel guitarist and producer
- Walter Battison Haynes (1859–1900), English pianist, organist and composer
- Warren Haynes (born 1960), American rock and blues guitarist
- Willie Haynes (1901–1981), American baseball player
- William Haynes (comedian) (born 1993), American YouTube rand TV personality, rapper and podcast host
- William Haynes (swimmer) (1885/6–1954), British-Australian Olympic swimmer
- William E. Haynes (1829–1914), American politician
- William J. Haynes II (born 1958), American lawyer
- William Joseph Haynes Jr. (born 1949), American judge
- William S. Haynes (1864–1939), American flute manufacturer
- William Haynes-Smith (1839–1928), English colonial administrator
- Williams Haynes (1886–1970), American journalist and historian

== Fictional characters ==
- Mr. Haynes, in the novel Minty Alley by C. L. R. James
- Augustus Haynes, from the HBO drama The Wire
- Jason Haynes, from the BBC medical drama Holby City

== See also ==
- Bernie Haynes Robynson (1900–2001), American printmaker, illustrator
- Haynes King (born 2001), American football quarterback
