= Haines (surname) =

Other names
- Variant forms: Haine, Hayne, Haines, Hains, Hanes, and Haynes

Haines is a surname.

== Etymology ==
According to the Oxford Dictionary of Family Names in Britain and Ireland, the modern names Haine, Hayne, Haines, Hains, Hanes, and Haynes all originate in four different medieval names, which came to sound the same.

1. The Middle English name Hain. This is thought to have originated as a pet form of Anglo-Norman names such as Reynald, Reyner and Rainbert.
2. The personal name Hagan, which is itself of diverse origins.
3. The Old English word haga ('enclosure', Middle English hay), in the oblique case form hagan (Middle English hayne), whose use could have arisen from a locative epithet such as æt hagan ('at the enclosure').

The forms ending in -s show the addition of the genitive case ending, implying that the name-bearer was the child of a father called Hain, or addition of -s on the analogy of such names.

Additional etymologies for Haines and Haynes names not shared by the Hayne types are:

1. the place-name of Haynes, Bedfordshire, indicating people from that village (whose name itself derived from Old English *hægen ('enclosures').
2. the Irish name Hynes.

The Oxford Dictionary of Family Names in Britain and Ireland also considers the suggestion of origins in the Welsh name Einws (a pet form of Einion), but does not find evidence to support this.

== Distribution ==
Around 2011, there were 9551 bearers of the surname Haines in Great Britain and 79 in Ireland. In 1881, there were 6890 bearers of the name in Great Britain, concentrated in the south of England, particularly in London, Gloucestershire, Berkshire, Wiltshire, and Warwickshire, while around the mid-nineteenth century bearers of the name in Ireland were concentrated in Cork.

Haines is the 410th most common surname in Great Britain with 23,109 bearers. It is most common in Gwynedd where it is the 6th most common surname with 4,931 bearers. Other concentrations include Merseyside, (198th, 1,727), Cheshire, (213th, 1,739), West Yorkshire, (245th, 1,751), Surrey, (281st, 1,815) and Essex (404th, 1,715).

== Persons named Haines ==
- Albert R. Haines (1826–?), American politician from Ohio
- Alfred Haines (cricketer) (1877–1935), English cricketer for Gloucestershire
- Alfred Haines (pilot) (1898–1918), British World War I flying ace
- Amy Haines (1839–1921), (also known as Amelia Horne and Amelia Bennett) British memoire writer
- Andrew Haines (born 1947), British epidemiologist and academic
- Andy Haines (born 1977), American baseball coach
- Avery Haines (born 1966), Canadian television journalist
- Avril Haines (born 1969), American first female Director of National Intelligence
- Bob Haines (1906–1965), English cricketer
- Bryant Haines (born 1985), American football coach
- Carolyn Haines (born 1953), American author
- Casey Haines (born 1986), American ice hockey player
- Clinton Haines (1976–1997), Queensland, Australian computer hacker
- Coral-Jade Haines (born 1996), English footballer
- Daniel Haines (1801–1877), American jurist and governor of New Jersey
- Daniel Haines (footballer) (born 1981), West Australian rules footballer
- David Haines (aid worker) (1970–2014), British aid worker who was captured by ISIL and beheaded
- Denis Haines, English musician with The Hollies and Gary Numan
- Donald Haines (1918–1941), American child actor (Our Gang)
- Elijah Haines, politician and author
- Elwood Lindsay Haines (1893–1949), Episcopal bishop in the United States
- Emily Haines (born 1974), Canadian vocalist for the bands Metric and Broken Social Scene
- Eric Haines (born 1958), American computer graphics professional
- Francina E. Haines, for whom Haines, Alaska was named.
- Fred Haines (1936–2008), American screenwriter and film director
- Fred S. Haines (1879–1960), Canadian painter from Meaford Ontario
- Frederick Haines (1819–1909), British Field Marshal and Commander-in-Chief of British forces in India
- Gail Haines, US politician, member of the Michigan House of Representatives
- George Haines (1924–2006), US swimmer and swimming coach
- Harry L. Haines (1880–1947), United States Congressman from Pennsylvania
- Henry Haines (1836–1923), Railroad man, Confederate Colonel, Haines City Florida
- Hinkey Haines (1898–1979), American football and baseball player from Pennsylvania
- Jackson Haines (1840–1875), American ballet dancer and figure skater
- Janine Haines (1945–2004), South Australian politician
- Jeffrey Robert Haines (born 1958), American Roman Catholic bishop
- Jesse Haines (1893–1978), American baseball player
- Jim Haines (born 1945), Victorian Australian rules footballer
- Job Haines (1744–1812), American politician from Maryland
- Joe Haines (journalist) (1928–2025), British journalist and press secretary to PM Harold Wilson
- Joe Haines (politician) (1923–2015), US member of the Ohio House of Representatives
- John Haines (disambiguation), several people, including:
  - John Haines (1924–2011), poet and educator
  - John Charles Haines, (1818–1896), American businessman and politician, mayor of Chicago (1858–1860)
  - John Sydney Haines (1937–2009), Australian motor boat builder and racer
- John Haines (1964-Present)USMC , proud father and grandfather
- Joseph Haines (died 1701), English actor, singer, and dancer
- Kathryn Miller Haines, American novelist and actor
- Ken Haines, co-founder of Haines and Bronner UK
- Larry Haines (1918–2008), American radio and soap opera actor
- Lawrence Courtney Haines (c.1920–1996), Australian ornithologist, oologist and taxidermist
- Linda M. Haines (born 1944), English and South African statistician
- Lowell Haines, American lawyer and Taylor University president
- Luke Haines (born 1967), English musician
- Mahlon Haines (1875–1962), US businessman and shoe salesman
- Marie Bruner Haines (1885–1979), American painter and illustrator
- Mark Haines, (1946–2011) TV host, CNBC network
- Martha Haines (1923–2011), All-American Girls Professional Baseball League player
- Nathan Haines (1972– ), New Zealand jazz musician
- Nathan Haines (priest) (c.1735–1806), English priest
- Paul Haines (fiction writer) (1970–2012), New Zealand-born horror and Sci-Fi writer
- Paul Haines (poet) (1933–2003), US and Canadian poet and jazz lyricist
- Ralph E. Haines, Jr. (1913–2011), United States Army four-star general
- Reuben Haines III (1786–1831), American ornithologist and firefighter
- Sara Haines (born 1977), American television host and journalist
- Sarah Platt Doremus (née Haines) (1802–1877), American philanthropist
- Stephen G. Haines (1945–2012), American organizational theorist, management consultant
- Steve Haines, fictional character from Grand Theft Auto V.
- Syd Haines, New Zealand (soccer) footballer
- Thomas E. Haines (1831–1908), American politician from Iowa
- Tom Haines (born 1977), English composer and sound designer
- Townsend Haines (1792–1865), American politician and judge from Pennsylvania
- Walter Stanley Haines (1850–1923), American forensic scientist
- William Haines (disambiguation), several people including:
  - William Haines (1900–1973), American actor in silent movies
  - William Haines (Australian politician) (1810–1866), first Premier of Victoria
  - William Haines (South Australian politician) (1831–1902), a South Australian politician
  - William Henry Haines (1811–1884), English painter
  - William Wister Haines (1908–1989), American author, screenwriter, and playwright
  - Willie Haines (1900–1974), Portsmouth and Southampton footballer
