= Hannett =

Origin
- Region of origin: United Kingdom

Hannett is a surname of United Kingdom descent.

== Etymology ==
According to the Oxford Dictionary of Family Names in Britain and Ireland, the modern name Hannett originates in two different medieval names, which came to sound the same around the sixteenth century. It is a variant of the more common form Hamnett.

The first is the personal name Hamunet: its use as a second name originated to indicate that a person was a child of someone called Hamunet. The earliest attested forms of this name occur in Old German, as Haimo. This Old German name was borrowed into Old French, including into the Anglo-Norman dialect spoken in England, as Haim, Haimes (in the nominative case), and Haimon (in the oblique case) — along with variant pronunciations and spellings, which became sources of English surnames like Hame, Haim, Haime, Haimes, Hains, Haines, Hayns, Haynes, Hammon and Hammond. The form Haimon was then combined with the Anglo-Norman diminutive suffix -et, giving the pet-name Hamunet.

The second source of the surname Hamnett is the place-name Hampnett, found in Gloucestershire and in the forms Westhampnett and East Hampnett in Sussex. It thus first came to be used as a second name to indicate that a person came from one of these settlements. These names come in turn from the Old English words hēah ('high') and tūn ('estate, farmstead', thus meaning 'high farmstead') with the later addition of the Anglo-Norman diminutive suffix -et.

== Distribution ==
As of around 2011, 116 individuals had the surname Hannett in Great Britain, and none in Ireland. In 1881, 74 people in Great Britain had the name, being clustered in Lancashire, Lincolnshire, and Nottinghamshire.

== People with the surname ==
- Arthur T. Hannett (1884–1966), US politician
- John Hannett, Baron Hannett of Everton (born 1953), British trade unionist
- Martin Hannett (1948–1991), English record producer
- Rhonda Hannett, Australian basketball player
