= Hanes (disambiguation) =

Hanes is an American clothing brand.

Hanes, Hånes or Haneș can also refer to:

- Hanes (name), which can be both a masculine given name, a middle name, and a surname
- Haneș River, a river in Romania
- Hanes Field, a football and baseball stadium in Durham, North Carolina, U.S. from 1913 to 1995
- Hånes, a district of Kristiansand, Norway

- Hånes Church, a church in this district

- Petre V. Haneș (1879 – 1966), a Romanian literary historian

== See also ==
- Hanes–Woolf plot, a type of enzyme activity plot in biochemistry
- Hanes Taliesin, a historical document containing a legendary biography of the Brittonic poet Taliesin
- P.H. Hanes Knitting Company, a historic textile mill complex in Winston-Salem, North Carolina, U.S.
- Robert M. Hanes House, a historic house in Winston-Salem, North Carolina, U.S.
- Meir Ba'al HaNes (disambiguation)
- Haines (disambiguation)
- Haynes (disambiguation)
