= Hayne =

Hayne is a surname of English origin.

== Etymology ==
According to the Oxford Dictionary of Family Names in Britain and Ireland, modern names Haine, Hayne, Haines, Hains, Hanes, and Haynes all in four different medieval names, which came to sound the same.

1. The Middle English name Hain. This is thought to have originated as a pet form of Anglo-Norman names such as Reynald, Reyner and Rainbert.
2. The personal name Hagan, which is itself of diverse origins.
3. The Old English word haga ('enclosure', Middle English hay), in the oblique case form hagan (Middle English hayne), whose use could have arisen from a locative epithet such as æt hagan ('at the enclosure').
4. Perhaps the Middle English word heyne (and its variants, such as haine, hayn), meaning 'mean wretch, niggard'.

== Distribution ==
Around 2011, there were 533 bearers of the surname Hayne in Great Britain and none in Ireland. In 1881, there were 774 bearers of the name in Great Britain, concentrated in the south-west of England, particularly in Dorset.

== People ==
- Arthur P. Hayne (1788–1867), United States Senator from South Carolina
- Charles Seale-Hayne (1833–1903), British businessman and Liberal politician
- Edward G. Hayne (1874–1945), American businessman and politician
- Edwin Hayne, South African flying ace
- Friedrich Gottlob Hayne (1763–1832), a botanist
- Gareth Hayne, New Zealand cricketer
- George Hayne, British merchant and entrepreneur
- Isaac Hayne, a South Carolinian executed during the American Revolutionary War
- Jarryd Hayne, an Australian rugby league footballer
- Kenneth Hayne, a Puisne Justice of the High Court of Australia
- Paul Hamilton Hayne, (1830 – 1886) Southern American poet, critic, and editor
- Richard Hayne (1947- ) president and CEO of Urban Outfitters
- Robert Y. Hayne, a United States Senator from South Carolina
- Steven Hayne, a forensic pathologist from Mississippi

== See also ==
- Hayne van Ghizeghem, Flemish Renaissance musician
- Hain (disambiguation)
- Haine (disambiguation)
- Haynes (disambiguation)
