= Hamnett =

Hamnett, and its spelling variants Hamnet and Hannett, is a personal name (now usually or only found as a surname).

== Etymology ==
According to the Oxford Dictionary of Family Names in Britain and Ireland, the modern name Hamnett originates in two medieval names, which came to sound the same around the sixteenth century.

The first is the personal name Hamunet: its use as a second name originated to indicate that a person was a child of someone called Hamunet. The earliest attested forms of this name occur in Old German, as Haimo. This Old German name was borrowed into Old French, including into the Anglo-Norman dialect spoken in England, as Haim, Haimes (in the nominative case), and Haimon (in the oblique case) — along with variant pronunciations and spellings, which became sources of English surnames like Hame, Haim, Haime, Haimes, Hains, Haines, Hayns, Haynes, Hammon and Hammond. The form Haimon was then combined with the Anglo-Norman diminutive suffix -et, giving the pet-name Hamunet.

The second source of the surname Hamnett is the place-name Hampnett, found in Gloucestershire and in the forms Westhampnett and East Hampnett in Sussex. It thus first came to be used as a second name to indicate that a person came from one of these settlements. These names come in turn from the Old English words hēah ('high') and tūn ('estate, farmstead', thus meaning 'high farmstead') with the later addition of the Anglo-Norman diminutive suffix -et.

== Distribution ==
As of around 2011, 1543 individuals had the surname Hamnett in Great Britain, and 21 in Ireland. In 1881, 991 people in Great Britain had the name, being clustered in the south-west of England, especially Devon. Meanwhile, Irish bearers of the name around the middle of the nineteenth century clustered in Dublin.

== Notable people ==
- Hamnet Shakespeare (1585–1596), son of William Shakespeare
- Ade Hamnett (1882–1956), English footballer
- Belinda Hamnett (born 1975), Hong Kong actress and model
- Bob Hamnett (1889–1967), English footballer
- Cyril Hamnett, Baron Hamnett (1906–1980), British journalist and politician
- Katharine Hamnett (born 1947), English fashion designer
- Nina Hamnett (1890–1956), Welsh artist and writer
- Olivia Hamnett (died 2001), English actress

== See also ==
- Hamnet (disambiguation)
