= Hanes (name) =

Hanes is a name. It can be a masculine given name, a middle name, or a surname. Notable people with this name include:

== As a given name or middle name ==
- Hanes Walton Jr. (1941 – 2013), an American political scientist and African-American studies professor
- William Hanes Ayres (1916 – 2000), an American salesman, World War II veteran, and state politician from Ohio

== As a surname ==
- Adam Hanes (born 2002), a Slovak football player
- Art Hanes (1916 – 1997), an American mayor of Birmingham, Alabama
- D. Bruce Hanes (fl. 2007 – present), an American register of wills
- Ed Hanes (fl. 2012 – present), an American state politician from North Carolina
- Elizabeth Hanes (born 1978), an American lawyer
- George Samuel Hanes (1882 – 1957), a Canadian engineer and politician
- Helen Copenhaver Hanes (1917 – 2013), an American promoter
- John Hanes (disambiguation), multiple people
- Julia Hanes (born 1995), Canadian para-athletics athlete
- Madlyn L. Hanes (born 1948), an American academic administrator
- Michael D. Hanes (fl. 1965 – present), an American music professor emeritus
- Phil Hanes (1926 – 2011), an American businessman and art conserver
- Tyler Hanes (born 1982), an American actor

== See also ==
- Haines (surname)
- Haynes (surname)
- Hanes, an American clothing brand
- Hanes (disambiguation)
