= Stephen Haines =

Stephen Haines may refer to:

- Stephen Haines, Green candidate in the Queensland state election, 2009
- Stephen G. Haines (1945–2012), American organizational theorist and management consultant
- Mrs. Stephen Haines, a role of Norma Shearer in the 1939 film The Women
- Stephen Haines (neurosurgeon), American neurosurgeon and academic.

== See also ==
- Haines (disambiguation)
- Haynes (disambiguation)
