= John Haines (disambiguation) =

John Haines (1924–2011) was a poet laureate of Alaska.

John Haines may also refer to:

- John Haines (cricketer) (1825–1894), English first-class cricketer
- John Haines (priest), 17th-century Irish Anglican priest
- John Haines (American football) (born 1961), American football player
- John Charles Haines (1818–1896), American politician, Mayor of Chicago, Illinois (1858–1860)
- John M. Haines (1863–1917), American politician, Governor of Idaho (1913–1915)
- John Peter Haines (1851–1921), president of the American Society for the Prevention of Cruelty to Animals
- John Sydney Haines (1937–2009), Australian boat builder and racer
- John Thomas Haines (c.1799–1843), English actor and dramatist
- John Haines (sprinter) (1932–2021), winner of the 60 yards at the 1956 USA Indoor Track and Field Championships

== See also ==
- Jack Haines (John Thomas William Haines, 1920–1987), English international football (soccer) player
- John Hanes (disambiguation)
- John Haynes (disambiguation)
