= Haimo =

Haimo, also spelled Hamo, Heimo, Hamon, Haim, Haym, Heym, Aymo, Aimo, etc., is a masculine given name of Germanic origin. The Old French forms are Haimon, Aymon, Aimon, Aymes. It is a hypocoristic form of various Germanic names beginning with the radical haim-, meaning "home".

== Appearance in modern Anglophone naming ==
Haimo is the origin of a wide range of surnames, including English surnames like Hame, Haim, Haime, Haimes, Hains, Haines, Hayns, Haynes, Hammon, Hammond, and Fitzhamon. The Old French form Haimon was then combined with the diminutive suffix -et, giving the pet-name Hamunet, which in turn gave rise to the English name Hamnett and its variants.

== People ==
Listed chronologically.

- Aimo (d. 1173), French monk, mystic and saint
- Heymo (bishop of Wrocław) (r. 1120–1126)
- Heimo (bishop of Vác) (r. 1244–1254)

Aymon

- Aymon de Briançon (d. 1211), archbishop of Tarentaise
- Aymon II of Geneva (r. 1265–1280), count
- Aymon, Count of Savoy (r. 1329–1343)
- Aymon III of Geneva (r. 1367), count
- Aymon of Ortinge (fl. 1369), French mercenary captain
- Aymon of Challant (d. c. 1387), Aostan nobleman
- Aymon I de Chissé (d. 1428), bishop of Nice and Grenoble
- Aymon II de Chissé (d. 1450), bishop of Nice and Grenoble

Haimo

- Haimo of Auxerre (d. c. 865), French monk and biblical scholar
- Haimo de Valognes (r. 1086), Anglo Norman lord in Suffolk

Haymo

- Haymo of Halberstadt (died 853), German monk, bishop and biblical scholar
- Haymo of Faversham (d. c. 1243), English Franciscan scholar

Hamo

- Hamo the Steward (fl. 1071–1076), Anglo-Norman sheriff of Kent
- Hamo Dapifer (d. c. 1100), Anglo-Norman official
- Hamo (dean of Lincoln) (fl. 1189–1195)
- Hamo (dean of York) (fl. 1216–1219)
- Hamo de Crevecoeur (d. 1263), Anglo-Norman official
- Hamo le Strange (d. 1272/1273), English crusader
- Hamo Box (b. c. 1271), Sheriff of London
- Hamo Hethe (c. 1275–1352), bishop of Rochester
- Hamo Thornycroft (1850–1925), English sculptor

Hamon

- Hamon Dentatus (d. 1047), Norman baron
- Hamon de Massey (fl. c. 1070), Anglo-Norman baron
- Hamon Sutton (d. 1461/1462), English MP

== See also ==
- Duke Aymon, a character in several Old French and Italian epics
- Heime, a figure popular in German and Scandinavian legends
- Haymon, a figure of Tyrolean legend
- Deborah and Franklin Haimo Awards for Distinguished College or University Teaching of Mathematics, given by the Mathematical Association of America
