= Richard Haynes =

Richard Haynes may refer to:

- Richard Haynes (cricketer) (1913–1976), English cricketer
- Richard Haynes (lawyer) (1927–2017), American defense attorney
- Richard Haynes (musician) (born 1983), Australian clarinettist
- Richard Septimus Haynes (1857–1922), Australian barrister and politician

== See also ==
- Dick Haynes (1911–1980), American actor
