= Henry Haynes =

Henry Haynes may refer to:

- Henry Haynes (cricketer) (1834–1892), Barbadian cricketer
- Henry Botting Haynes (1870–1942), Australian Anglican priest
- Henry Williamson Haynes (1831–1912), American archaeologist
- Henry D. "Homer" Haynes (1920–1971), American comedy entertainer and musician
