= Michael Haynes =

Michael Haynes may refer to:

- Michael Haynes (defensive lineman) (born 1980), former defensive tackle in the NFL
- Michael Haynes (wide receiver) (born 1965), former wide receiver in the NFL
- Michael E. Haynes (1927–2019), American minister and former politician
- Mike Haynes (cornerback) (born 1953), former NFL cornerback for the Patriots and Raiders
- Michael Haynes (wrestler) (born 1964), American wrestler known as Prince Iaukea
- Michael Haynes (cricketer) (1936–1997), English cricketer
- Mike Haynes (ice hockey), American sportscaster
- Michael Haynes, a pseudonym of the train robber Ronald Biggs
