= Frederick Haynes =

Frederick or Fred Haynes may refer to:

- Frederick Haynes (artist) (1832–1897), British painter
- Fred E. Haynes Jr. (1921–2010), U.S. Marine Corps Major General
- Fred Haynes (born 1952), British-Canadian politician
- Frederick Haynes III (born 1960), American pastor and politician

== See also ==
- Fred Haines (disambiguation)
