= John Haynes =

John Haynes may refer to:

- John Haynes (draughtsman) (fl. 1730–1750), British draughtsman and engraver
- John Haynes (governor) (1594–1653/54), colonial governor of Massachusetts and Connecticut
- John Haynes (journalist) (1850–1917), Australian journalist and politician
- John Haynes Jr. (1937–2021), family physician, surgeon and community leader of Northwest Louisiana and Northeast Texas
- John Carmichael Haynes (1831–1888), Irish-born rancher, judge and public servant in British Columbia
- John Earl Haynes (born 1944), American historian
- John Henry Haynes (1849–1910), American traveller, archaeologist, and photographer
- John Randolph Haynes (1853–1937), California socialist
- John C. Haynes & Co., American maker of musical instruments (late 19th century)
- Johnny Haynes (1934–2005), English footballer

== See also ==
- John Haynes Holmes (1879–1964), American politician
- John Haines (disambiguation)
- John Hanes (disambiguation)
