= Samuel Haynes =

Samuel Haynes may refer to:

- Samuel Haynes (historian) (died 1752), English writer and historian
- Samuel Johnson Haynes (1852–1932), Australian lawyer and politician
- Samuel Alfred Haynes (1899–1971), Belizean writer and political activist
- Sammy Haynes (1920–1997), American baseball player
