= Jim Haynes (disambiguation) =

Jim Haynes was an American-born figure in the British "underground" and alternative/counter-culture scene of the 1960s.

Jim or James Haynes may also refer to:

- Jim Haynes (writer), Australian writer
- James Haynes (American football), American football linebacker
- James Haynes (cricketer), English cricketer
- James Haynes (writer) (1788–1851), Irish journalist and playwright
- J. C. Haynes (James Clark Haynes), mayor of Minneapolis
