= Joseph Haynes =

Joseph or Joe Haynes may refer to:

- Joseph Haynes (painter) (1760–1829), English etcher and engraver
- Joseph E. Haynes (1827–1897), mayor of Newark, New Jersey
- Joe Haynes (baseball) (1917–1967), American baseball player, coach and executive
- Joe M. Haynes (1936–2018), Tennessee politician

== See also ==
- Joe Haines (disambiguation)
