= Afro-American Film Company =

American film production company

Afro-American Film Company was a film production company in the United States. Black businessman Hunter Haynes was part of it. He went on to establish his own film company. Afro-American Film Company was owned by whites. It made films with black casts.

It was established in Kansas City, Missouri. Its films were controversial.

Haynes filmed black organizations in Philadelphia. The quality of its films was criticized.

== Filmography ==
- Him Dandy's Dream
- By the Help of Uncle Eben
- One Large Evening
- Mandy's Choice
- Lovey Hoes's Romance
- The Tango Queen

== See also ==
- African American cinema
