= Penn State Harrisburg =

Public university in Lower Swatara Township, Pennsylvania, US

Coordinates: 40.205525°N 76.746433°W

- Former name: Penn State Capitol Campus (1966–1986)
- Type: Public satellite campus
- Established: 1966; 60 years ago
- Parent institution: Pennsylvania State University
- Chancellor: David M. Callejo Pérez
- President: Neeli Bendapudi
- Faculty: 160 full time 98 part time
- Students: 4,442 (Fall 2025)
- Undergraduates: 4,041 (Fall 2025)
- Postgraduates: 401 (Fall 2025)
- Location: Lower Swatara Township, Pennsylvania, U.S.
- Campus: Suburban, 218 acres (890,000 m²)
- Sporting affiliations: NCAA Division III - UEC
- Mascot: Nittany Lion
- Website: harrisburg.psu.edu

Pennsylvania State University at Harrisburg—Capital College, commonly known as Penn State Harrisburg, is an undergraduate college and graduate school of the Pennsylvania State University located in Lower Swatara Township, Pennsylvania. The campus is 9 miles (14 km) south of Harrisburg. Penn State offers 2 associate, 34 baccalaureate, 19 master's, and three doctoral degree programs as well as certificate, certification, and joint degree programs. It was an upper division college (serving only juniors and seniors) from its founding in 1966 until accepting freshmen and sophomores in 2004.

The "Penn State Eastgate Center" opened in 1991 in downtown Harrisburg and contains state agencies such as the Pennsylvania Securities Commission and Pennsylvania Municipal Retirement System as well as hearing rooms for workers compensation that also occupy space in the building. As of 2012, all classrooms and administrative personnel previously located in this building were relocated to the Middletown campus.

== History ==
The college was initially founded in 1966 as the "Penn State Capitol Campus". This new campus was exclusively for upper division undergraduates and graduate students. The first students graduated from the Capitol College in 1968, with the first on-campus graduation taking place in 1969.

The school gained college status in 1986 and was subsequently renamed as the "Pennsylvania State University at Harrisburg—Capital College". Two years later, the college granted its first doctorate degrees.

The college welcomed its first four-year undergraduates in 2001, with its first student housing opening in 2002. Penn State Harrisburg was considered fully transitioned into a four-year college by 2004.

== Academics ==
As a college and graduate school of the Pennsylvania State University, Penn State Harrisburg grants associate, bachelor's, master's, and doctoral degrees. In addition to the 33 full baccalaureate programs it offers, as one of the 24 campuses of the Penn State, the college also offers the first two years of study leading to more than 160 majors offered throughout the Penn State system. The college also houses 24 master's degree programs, as well as doctoral programs in American Studies, Engineering Systems, and Public Administration.

At the transfer level, the college serves students from all Commonwealth campuses of the Pennsylvania State University, as well as students from community colleges and other accredited colleges and universities.

The college also is the academic and administrative home of the Penn State Intercollege Master of Professional Studies Program in Homeland Security (iMPS-HLS), a partnership of six Penn State colleges sponsoring an online graduate degree program delivered by Penn State World Campus.

== Campus ==
Penn State Harrisburg's campus is located along the Susquehanna River near Middletown, Pennsylvania. Two other Penn State campuses, the Penn State University College of Medicine (which is affiliated with the nearby Penn State Milton S. Hershey Medical Center) and Penn State Dickinson Law are located in the surrounding region.

The area that the campus now occupies was originally used for farming, before serving as Olmsted Air Force Base. It was purchased by Penn State University at the time of the college's founding.

== Library ==
As a medium-sized academic library with 275,000 volumes, over 1 million pieces of microfilm, 1,430 journal subscriptions, and 300 databases, the Madlyn L. Hanes Library was planned from the outset as a "hybrid" print/electronic library that could accommodate new technologies without sacrificing the personal warmth of the traditional library. The library is a 115,000-square-foot (10,700 m^{2}) modern facility and officially opened on January 10, 2000, for the start of spring semester. In 2022, the library was named in honor of former Penn State Harrisburg Chancellor Madlyn L. Hanes.

== Student life ==
Undergraduate demographics as of Fall 2023
Race and ethnicity	Total
White	47%
International student	16%
Asian	14%
Black	10%
Hispanic	8%
Two or more races	4%
Unknown	2%
Economic diversity
Low-income (Note: The percentage of students who received an income-based federal Pell grant intended for low-income students.)	27%
Affluent (Note: The percentage of students who are a part of the American middle class at the bare minimum.)	73%

=== Greek life ===
The college has several fraternities and sororities.

== Athletics ==
After a 10-year break from intercollegiate athletics, Penn State–Harrisburg brought back the department as of fall of the 2005–06 academic year. The college now competes in NCAA's Division III (United East Conference). They formerly competed primarily in the Capital Athletic Conference (CAC), from July, 2013- June, 2019.

Penn State–Harrisburg was formerly a member of the North Eastern Athletic Conference (NEAC) from 2007–08 to 2012–13. In July, 2019 PSU-H rejoined the NEAC (currently rebranded as the United East Conference).Penn State–Harrisburg sponsors the following teams: men's and women's basketball, field hockey, men's and women's cross country, golf, men's and women's soccer, baseball, softball, men's and women's tennis, and women's volleyball.
