= Hamnet =

Hamnet may refer to:

- Hamnet Shakespeare (1585–1596), the only son of English playwright William Shakespeare.
- Hamnet (novel), a 2020 novel by Maggie O'Farrell
  - Hamnet (film), a 2025 British-American film based on the novel
- Hamnet Holditch (1800–1867), English mathematician
- Variant spelling of Hamnett, a surname
- HAMNET, an autonomous IP network for radio amateurs

== See also ==
- The Hamnet Players, a virtual theatre company
