= Haynes =

Haynes may refer to:

== People ==
- Haynes (surname)

== Places ==
=== Australia ===
- Haynes, Western Australia

=== Canada ===
- Haynes, Alberta

=== United Kingdom ===
- Haynes, Bedfordshire
  - Haynes Church End

=== United States ===
- Haynes, Arkansas
- Haynes, North Dakota
- Haynes, Ohio
- Haynes Township, Michigan

== Other uses ==
- Haynes International, a US corporation specializing in corrosion-resistant metal alloys
- Haynes Manuals, set of manuals for automobile repair and other do it yourself projects
- Haynes Automobile Company, a defunct American automobile company
- John C. Haynes & Co., a musical instrument maker
- William S. Haynes Flute Company, American flute maker
- Haynes v. United States, a United States Supreme Court decision
- Haynes International Motor Museum, a motor museum in Sparkford, Somerset, England.

== See also ==
- Haine
- Hayne
- Haines (disambiguation)
- Hanes
- Hayes
- Hawnes
