= Fred Haines (disambiguation) =

Fred Haines may refer to:

- Fred Haines (1936–2008), American screenwriter and film director
- Fred S. Haines (1879–1960), Canadian painter
- Sir Frederick Haines (1819–1909), British army officer

== See also ==
- Frederick Haynes (disambiguation)
