= Haimes =

Haimes is an English language surname.

== Etymology ==
According to the Oxford Dictionary of Family Names in Britain and Ireland, the modern name Haimes originates in two different medieval names, which came to sound the same around the sixteenth century. In both cases, neither name originally ended in -s; this was added later, sometimes perhaps as a genitive case ending.

The first is the personal name Haim: its use as a second name originated to indicate that a person was a child of someone called Haim. The earliest attested forms of this name occur in Old German, as Haimo. This Old German name was borrowed into Old French, including into the Anglo-Norman dialect spoken in England, as Haim, Haimes (in the nominative case), and Haimon (in the oblique case) — along with variant pronunciations and spellings, which became sources of English surnames like Hame, Haim, Haime, Haimes, Hains, Haines, Hayns, Haynes, Hammon and Hammond.

The second source of the surname Haimes is the common place-name Hamm, which derives from the Old English word hamm, meaning 'land in a river bend', 'river meadow', 'marshy land'.

== Frequency ==
As of around 2011, 268 individuals had the surname Haimes in Great Britain, and none in Ireland. In 1881, 171 people in Great Britain had the name.

== People ==
People with this name include:

- Judith Richardson Haimes, American psychic, subject of famous lawsuit
- John Haimes (c. 1826–1890), Australian pastoralist and brewer
- Marc Haimes, American screenwriter and DreamWorks Pictures executive known for Kubo and the Two Strings
- Todd Haimes (1956–2023), American artistic director

== See also ==
- Haines (disambiguation)
- Haines (surname)
