= One Large Evening =

1914 short American film

One Large Evening, also known as A Night in Coontown, is a 1914 short American film. It was produced by Hunter Haynes. A short filmed in black and white, Larry Richards describes it as offensive with derogatory stereotypes of blacks. It is set in Harlem.

Lester Walton wrote about how the film was retitled for white audiences.

It was an Afro-American Film Company production. The film Mandy's Choice followed.

== Cast ==
- Charles Sidney Gilpin
- Marie Young
- Leon Williams
- Sara Green Byrd
- Anthony Byrd
- Eva Johnson
