= Joe Haines =

Joe Haines is the name of:

- Joe Haines (journalist) (1928–2025), British journalist and press secretary to Labour leader and Prime Minister Harold Wilson
- Joe Haines (politician) (1923–2015), former member of the Ohio House of Representatives
- Joe Haines (speedway rider) (born 1991), speedway rider for the Rye House Rockets

== See also ==
- Joseph Haines (died 1701), actor and performer
- Joseph Haynes (disambiguation)
