= Haine (disambiguation) =

The Haine is a river in southwestern Belgium and northern France.

Haine may also refer to:

- Haine (surname)
- Haine (film), a 1980 French film starring Klaus Kinski
- La Haine, a 1995 French film
- La Haine (drama), an 1874 drama by Sardou
- Haine, a hamlet in Manston, Kent, England
- Haine Otomiya, the protagonist of the manga The Gentlemen's Alliance Cross by Arina Tanemura
- Haine, a figure in Hadza mythology
- Haine Eames (born 2008), Australian soccer player

== See also ==
- Haines (disambiguation)
