= Haines =

Haines may refer to:

- Haines (surname), includes partial list of people with the surname
- Haines (character), a character in James Joyce's Ulysses

== Places ==
=== Antarctica ===
- Haines Glacier, Antarctica
- Haines Mountains, mountain range in Antarctica

=== Australia ===
- Haines, South Australia, a locality on Kangaroo Island
- Hundred of Haines, a cadastral unit in South Australia

=== Canada ===
- Haines Junction, Yukon, town in Yukon Territory, Canada

- Haines Junction Airport

=== United States ===
- Haines, Alaska, city in Haines Borough, Alaska, US

- Haines Airport, an airport in Haines, Alaska, US
- Haines Seaplane Base, a seaplane base in Haines, Alaska, US

- Haines Borough, Alaska, US
- Haines, Oregon, town in Baker County, Oregon, US
- Haines City, Florida, city in Polk County, Florida, US
- Haines Mission, an alternative name for Fort William H. Seward, Alaska, US
- Haines Falls, New York, town in Greene County, New York, US
- Haines Township, Pennsylvania, town in Centre County, Pennsylvania, US

== Other ==
- 26879 Haines, asteroid
- Haines Index, a weather index devised by Donald Haines in 1988
- Haines Highway, highway between Alaska, US, and British Columbia, Canada
- HAINES, a recovery position used in first aid to maintain an open airway for victims with known or possible spinal injuries
- USS Haines (APD-84), US Navy ship launched in 1943
- Three Rivers Municipal Dr. Haines Airport, Michigan, US

== See also ==
- includes people with surname Haines
- Haine (disambiguation)
- Hanes
- Haynes (disambiguation)
- Haimes (surname)
