= William Haines (disambiguation) =

William Haines (1900–1973) was an American movie actor who later became a designer of furniture and interiors.

William Haines may also refer to:

- William Haines (artist) (1778–1848), English engraver and painter
- William Haines (Australian politician) (1810–1866), Australian politician
- William Haines (South Australian politician) (1831–1902), S.A. pioneer
- William T. Haines (1854–1919), Governor of Maine from 1913 to 1915
- William Henry Haines (1811–1884), English painter
- William Wister Haines (1908–1989), American novelist
- C. William Haines (1928–1996), American politician in New Jersey
- Willie Haines (1900–1974), Portsmouth and Southampton footballer
