= Haine (surname) =

Haine is a surname.

== Etymology ==
According to the Oxford Dictionary of Family Names in Britain and Ireland, the modern names Haine, Hayne, Haines, Hains, Hanes, and Haynes all originate in four different medieval names, which came to sound the same.

1. The Middle English name Hain. This is thought to have originated as a pet form of Anglo-Norman names such as Reynald, Reyner and Rainbert.
2. The personal name Hagan, which is itself of diverse origins.
3. The Old English word haga ('enclosure', Middle English hay), in the oblique case form hagan (Middle English hayne), whose use could have arisen from a locative epithet such as æt hagan ('at the enclosure').
4. Perhaps the Middle English word heyne (and its variants, such as haine, hayn), meaning 'mean wretch, niggard'.

== Distribution ==
As of around 2011, 386 individuals had the surname Haine in Great Britain, and 9 in Ireland. In 1881, 424 people in Great Britain had the name, being clustered in the south of England, especially Somerset and Dorset. Meanwhile, Irish bearers of the name around the middle of the nineteenth century clustered in Dublin.

== People ==
Haine is the surname of the following people

- Audrey Haine (1927–2021), American baseball player
- Tom Haine (1933–1994), American volleyball player
- William R. Haine (1944–2021), American politician

== See also ==
- Haines (surname)
