= Isabel Haynes =

American businesswoman (1899–1993)

- Born: Isabel May Nauerth; October 25, 1899; Traer, Iowa
- Died: April 7, 1993 (aged 93); Bozeman, Montana
- Other name: Isabel Nauerth
- Citizenship: United States
- Education: University of Iowa, 1921 (teaching certificate)
- Occupation: Businesswoman
- Employer: Yellowstone National Park
- Known for: Manager of Yellowstone Park Lodge and Camps Company, owner of Haynes Picture Shops

Isabel May Haynes (October 25, 1899 – April 7, 1993) was an American businesswoman who managed Roosevelt Lodges in Yellowstone National Park. She alo co-owned and operated Haynes Picture Shops with Jack Ellis Haynes.

== Early life and education ==
Isabel Haynes was born on October 25, 1899, in Traer, Iowa to Dr. John and Gladys (Fleck) Nauerth. She graduated from the University of Iowa in 1921 with a bachelor of science degree in history and a teaching certificate. She then took a summer job with the Yellowstone Camps and Lodge Company in Yellowstone National Park.

== Business career ==
Isabel completed a resort management program in California in 1927. She then became the superintendent of the Yellowstone Park Lodge and Camps Company at Roosevelt Lodge, a position that she held for three years. Following her marriage to Jack E. Haynes in 1930, Isabel and her husband owned and operated Haynes Picture Shops throughout Yellowstone National Park. The pair had the exclusive rights to sell film and photographs within the park for many years. After Jack died in 1962, Isabel took over Haynes Inc. and Haynes Picture Shop and Studios and ran the business for six years until she sold it to Hamilton Stores, Inc in 1968.

== Personal life ==
In 1924, the Haynes family moved to Bozeman, Montana from St. Paul, Minnesota. On June 11, 1930, Isabel Haynes married Jack E. Haynes. In 1931, the couple had their first and only child, Lida Marie. In 1958, Isabel and Jack created the Haynes Foundation, which provides scholarships to students attending Montana universities and colleges. Isabel also established the Haynes Fine Art Gallery at Montana State University in Bozeman.

== Awards and recognition ==
Isabel earned the Blue and Gold award from Montana State University, the Sperry award from the Bozeman Chamber of Commerce, and honorary doctorates from Carroll College and Montana State University.

== Later years ==
Isabel served on the Montana State University Advisory Board and the Museum of the Rockies Board for many years. In 1970, Isabel donated the business papers, pictures, and negatives of the Haynes Photo Shops to the Montana Historical Society. She donated her personal and business papers to Special Collections at the Montana State University Library. In the 1970s, Isabel donated large collections of materials related to Yellowstone and the Haynes family to local and regional libraries. Finally, Isabel donated the Haynes building to the city of Bozeman as a gift on September 19, 1988. Isabel died on April 7, 1993 of pneumonia. Following her death, her personal property was sold at auction. The proceeds funded the Haynes Foundation.

== Publications ==
- Haynes, Isabel Nauerth. The House of Haynes. Bozeman, Mont.: Isabel Haynes, 1968.
