= Bob Haines =

English cricketer

Personal information
- Full name: Claude Vincent Godby Haines
- Born: 17 January 1906; Bristol, England
- Died: 28 January 1965 (aged 59); Lower Cwmtwrch, Glamorgan, Wales
- Nickname: Bob
- Batting: Right-handed
- Relatives: Alfred Haines (father)

Domestic team information
- Years: Team
- 1946: Devon
- 1933–1934: Glamorgan

Career statistics
Competition	First-class
Matches	12
Runs scored	350
Batting average	19.44
100s/50s	–/2
Top score	59
Balls bowled	60
Wickets	1
Bowling average	33.00
5 wickets in innings	–
10 wickets in match	–
Best bowling	1/15
Catches/stumpings	3/–
- Source: Cricinfo, 26 September 2011

Claude Vincent Godby Haines (17 January 1906 – 28 January 1965) was an English cricketer. Haines was a right-handed batsman. He was born in Bristol and educated at The King's School, Canterbury. He was known by his nickname of Bob.

Having played for the Kent Second XI in 1924, Haines joined Glamorgan nearly a decade later, making his first-class debut for the Welsh county against Nottinghamshire in the 1933 County Championship. He made eleven further first-class appearances for Glamorgan, the last of which came against Somerset in the 1934 County Championship. In his twelve first-class appearances, he scored a total of 350 runs at an average of 19.44, with a high score of 59. This score, which was one of two fifties he made, came against Sussex in 1933. During World War II, Haines was the match secretary for the British Empire XI, and following the war he played three matches for Devon in the 1946 Minor Counties Championship.

He died at Lower Cwmtwrch, Glamorgan on 28 January 1965. His father, Alfred, played first-class cricket for Gloucestershire.
