= Asbury F. Haynes =

Asbury Farnham Haynes
- Born: September 4, 1842; Edinburg, Maine
- Died: July 8, 1931 (aged 88); Seattle, Washington
- Burial place: Lake View Cemetery
- Military career
- Allegiance: United States of America
- Branch: United States Army
- Rank: Corporal
- Units: Company F, 17th Maine Volunteer Infantry
- Conflicts: American Civil War; Battle of Sailor's Creek
- Awards: Medal of Honor

Asbury Farnham Haynes (September 4, 1842 – July 8, 1931) was a Union Army soldier in the American Civil War who received the U.S. military's highest decoration, the Medal of Honor.

He was awarded the Medal of Honor for extraordinary heroism shown on April 6, 1865, during the Battle of Sailor's Creek, where he captured the colors of the 21st North Carolina in Lewis' Brigade, Walker's Division, of Gordon's 2nd Corps, while serving as a corporal with Company F, 17th Maine Volunteer Infantry.

Hawthorne moved to the state of Washington after the war and died there aged 88 on July 8, 1931. He was buried at Lake View Cemetery, Seattle.

== Medal of Honor citation ==
Capture of flag of 21st North Carolina.
