= Ken Haines =

American media executive

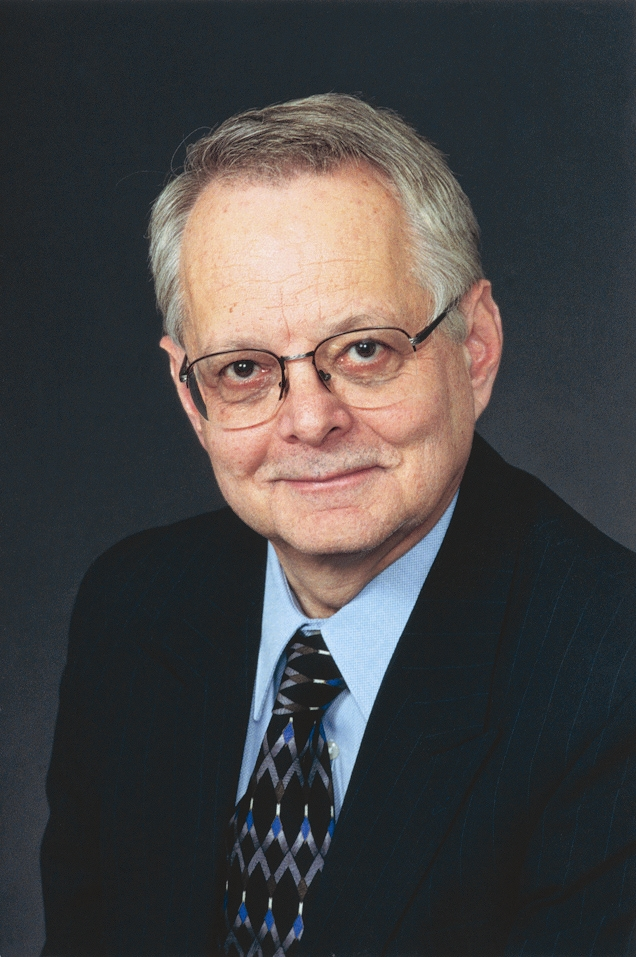
- Born: Kenneth Hileman Haines; September 5, 1942 (age 83); Spokane, Washington, U.S.
- Occupations: Sports television and media executive
- Known for: Retired president and CEO of Raycom Sports
- Spouse: Stephanie Phelps Haines
- Children: 1

Ken Haines (born September 5, 1942) is an American television sports broadcasting executive who is known for negotiating television media and marketing contracts with universities, conferences and major broadcasting networks and cable companies. He is a retired president and CEO from Raycom Sports.

== Early life and education ==
Haines has lived in Spokane, Washington; Forty Fort, Pennsylvania; and Lexington, Massachusetts, and attended high school at Washington-Lee in Arlington, Virginia. His father, Kenneth A. Haines, was an administrator with the U.S. Department of Agriculture and the U.S. State Department. He has one brother, Tom, who was an executive for the state of Washington in Seattle.

Haines received his bachelor's degree from Dakota Wesleyan University, Mitchell, South Dakota, in 1964. Graduate work at the University of Wyoming, Laramie, Wyoming (1965–1967). He earned a Master's of Science from Troy State University, Troy, Alabama, in 1970. He completed advanced graduate studies at Virginia Tech in 1976. Haines served as student body president at Dakota Wesleyan University in 1962.

== Professional career ==
Haines began his broadcasting career in 1962 in Mitchell, South Dakota, at KORN radio and television. While in Laramie he managed KLME radio (1966–1968) and established KUWR radio. He served in the US Army from 1968 to 1970 in flight operations. At Virginia Tech in Blacksburg, Virginia (1970–1981), Haines served as the executive to the university president and spokesperson for the university. He acquired WVTF, a National Public Radio station, for Virginia Tech and created the Virginia Tech Sports Network. He served as the game analyst on the radio network.

In 1981, Haines joined in the formation of Raycom Sports in Charlotte, North Carolina, where he negotiates television and new media digital contracts for Atlantic Coast Conference sports. From 1985 to 1995 he negotiated television contracts for Big Ten, Pac-10, Big Eight, Southwest Conference and Metro Conference football and basketball games. He also oversaw negotiations with ABC, CBS, ESPN and Fox Broadcasting Company for coverage of college football and basketball games.

In 2012, Haines negotiated a new 15 year (2013–2027) contract with ESPN and FOX for syndicated and cable coverage of Atlantic Coast Conference sporting events and with the Atlantic Coast Conference for digital and mobile rights.

Haines founded the Continental Tire Bowl in Charlotte in 2002, was instrumental in establishing the Blockbuster Bowl in Fort Lauderdale in 1990 and the college basketball Tournament of Champions in Charlotte in 1988. He also led the first HDTV telecast of a college basketball game (1999), the first telecast of the “Emmy Awards for Sports” (1988), the largest bulk buy of network time (all college basketball on ABC-TV, 1992–1995), the formation of ACC Properties (1994), the first comprehensive study regarding the feasibility of a college super conference (1990) and the entertainment series Elvis' Graceland (1987–1997). Haines is also known for the failed attempt to form a college football game in Russia, the Glasnost Bowl (1989)

He served as president of the University Faculty Club at Virginia Tech 1979–1981. Haines was a member of the publications board at Virginia Tech 1976–1980. He was a member of the board of directors of the Sunshine Football Classic in Fort Lauderdale, 1989–2000. Haines was executive director of the Charlotte LPGA golf tournament, 1997.

He is on the board of directors of Charlotte Collegiate Football and on the board of trustees of Dakota Wesleyan University. In 2007, Haines was published in the Charlotte Business Journal, contributing a piece called "A Tribute to Community".

=== Awards ===
- Opperman Distinguished Lecturer, Dakota Wesleyan University, 1998
- Outstanding TV Sports Executive, All American Football Foundation, 1999
- Outstanding Football Bowl Director, National Football Foundation, 2004
- Alumnus of the Year, Dakota Wesleyan University, 2005
- Tar Heel of the Week, Raleigh News and Observer, 2005
- Named fourth most powerful person in the Atlantic Coast Conference, Orlando Sentinel, 2009
- President's Award for Exemplary Service To The Atlantic Coast Conference, 2011–2012
- ACC Commissioner's Cup, 2013
- NACDA Golden Anniversary Honoree, 2015
