= Haynes, Ohio =

Unincorporated community in Ohio, U.S.

Coordinates: 39°26′05″N 82°40′45″W

Haynes is an unincorporated community in Hocking County, in the U.S. state of Ohio.

== History ==
A post office called Haynes was established in 1873, and remained in operation until 1913. Members of the Haynes family were considered prominent settlers in the area, according to local history.
