= Alfred Haines (cricketer) =

English cricketer

Alfred Hubert Haines (27 August 1877 – 30 May 1935) was an English first-class cricketer who played for Gloucestershire.

== Life ==
He was the son of Alfred Henry Haines, a surgeon.

A right-handed batsman from Long Sutton, Lincolnshire, and an alumnus of Merchant Taylor's School, Haines played sporadic first-class games for Gloucestershire, making seven appearances between 1901 and 1910. He also played for Wye College between 1910 and 1912. Across his seven appearances, he scored 117 runs at a batting average of 10.63, and a best of 23. He died in Ashford, Kent.

== Family ==
Haines married in 1905 Phyllis Godby, daughter of Charles Vincent Godby.

His sons both played cricket: David was born in June 1913 and played for Devon County Cricket Club, while Claude Vincent Godby Haines - known as Bob Haines - played for Glamorgan between 1933 and 1934.
