= Ray Haynes (footballer) =

Australian rules footballer

Personal information
- Full name: Ray Haynes
- Born: 24 November 1947 (age 78)
- Height: 177 cm (5 ft 10 in)
- Weight: 75 kg (165 lb)
- Position: Wing

Playing career^{1}
Years	Club	Games (Goals)
1967, 1969–70	Footscray	29 (1)
1971	Geelong	2 (0)
Total		31 (1)
- ^{1} Playing statistics correct to the end of 1971.

Ray Haynes (born 24 November 1947) is a former Australian rules footballer who played with Footscray and Geelong in the Victorian Football League (VFL).
