= Linda M. Haines =

English and South African statistician

Linda Margaret Haines (née Bower; born 1 August 1944 in Harrogate) is an English and South African statistician. Originally a chemist, she is known for her research in the design of experiments and in the application of those designs in clinical trials. She is a professor emeritus of statistical sciences at the University of Cape Town, the past president of the South African Statistical Association, and an elected member of the International Statistical Institute.

Linda Bower read chemistry in Newnham College, Cambridge and earned a double first in natural science at Cambridge in 1965. She earned a master's degree in 1967 at University College London, under the supervision of M. H. B. Stiddard, winning UCL's Ramsay Medal for the top postgraduate student in chemistry in her year. Moving to South Africa, she completed her Ph.D. in 1970, in inorganic chemistry, at the University of South Africa, and married chemist Raymond J. Haines, while also working at the National Chemical Research Laboratories in Pretoria. Her dissertation, A Synthetic Study of Some Tertiary Phosphine and Phosphite Complexes of Rhodium and Iridium, was jointly supervised by Eric Singleton and W. J. A. Steyn.

She returned to England as a researcher at the University of Sussex in 1972, and worked as a lecturer in chemistry at the University of Cape Town in 1975, but then began studying computer science and statistics at the University of South Africa while raising her children. In 1978, Haines became a lecturer in statistics and biometry at the University of Natal. She served as president of the South African Statistical Association for the 1999 term. In 2005 she moved as a full professor to the University of Cape Town. She retired from her professorship in 2009, and became an emeritus professor in 2013.
