= Jonathan Preston Haynes =

American murderer

- Born: March 10, 1958 (age 68); Rockville, Maryland, United States
- Other name: Aryan Beauty Killer
- Occupation: Chemist
- Motive: Neo-Nazism
- Convictions: First degree murder Burglary
- Penalty: Death; commuted to life imprisonment

Details
- Victims: Martin R. Sullivan; Frank Ringi
- Span of crimes: 27 May 1987 – 7 August 1993

Jonathan Preston Haynes (born 10 March 1958) is an American murderer known for racially motivated murders.

His parents, banker Edward Haynes and Custis Haynes, considered themselves to be liberal and open to people of any religion or race. The family closely followed the civil rights movement of the 1960s and 1970s.

As a child, Haynes was never popular, preferring books over people. He secretly read Adolf Hitler's Mein Kampf in high school, when what his father described as "his troubles" began.

On May 27, 1987, Haynes entered a beauty salon in San Francisco, California and asked for a consultation shortly before opening fire, Frank T. Ringi Jr. (42) and Tom Trulli were both shot multiple times, Ringi who was a well known hair stylist died from his wounds while Trulli survived. Frank T. Ringi Jr. was born on 5 February 1942 in Connecticut to Italian-American parents.

On August 6, 1993, Haynes entered a North Shore, Chicago office and shot a plastic surgeon Dr. Martin R. Sullivan (68) several times killing him. Sullivan was one of Chicago's most prominent plastic surgeons at the time. Haynes allegedly planned the shooting for around a week. Dr. Martin Russell Sullivan was born on October 12, 1924, in Chicago but would live most of his life in Wilmette, Illinois.

In 1994, Haynes was found guilty of the murders of Dr. Martin R. Sullivan and Frank Ringi. He represented himself in his trial and said he had to kill the doctor to protect the integrity of Aryan beauty.

Haynes was also accused of planning to kill Skokie plastic surgeon Dr. Robert Reich.

Haynes was sentenced to death for his crimes; however his sentence was commuted to life in prison after Illinois governor George Ryan commuted all death sentences to life without parole in 2003.
