= John Haines (priest) =

John Haines was an Anglican priest in the 17th century.

Haines and educated at Trinity College, Dublin. He was Archdeacon of Dublin from 1625 until 1635.
