= Grace Lynne Haynes =

American visual artist

Grace Lynne Haynes is an American visual artist whose artwork has appeared in numerous solo and group exhibitions; as well as in publications, including multiple appearances on the cover of The New Yorker.

== Education ==
In 2017, Haynes graduated from the ArtCenter College of Design with a BFA. Haynes is currently pursuing her MFA at the Mason Gross School of the Arts.

== Art career ==
=== New Yorker cover ===
Haynes' artwork graced the cover of the Aug 3–10, 2020 issue of The New Yorker. The new portrait of abolitionist Sojourner Truth, painted for the cover story of The New Yorker, is titled "Sojourner Truth, Founding Mother." The painting and the feature is an homage to Truth in honor of the 100th anniversary of the ratification of the 19th Amendment. Her work is in the permanent collection of the Pérez Art Museum Miami, Florida.
