= Nancy Haynes =

American painter (born 1947)

- Born: 1947 (age 78–79); Waterbury, Connecticut, U.S.
- Known for: Painting

Nancy Haynes (born 1947) is an American artist and educator. She lives between New York City, and Huerfano County, Colorado.

== Early life ==
Nancy Haynes was born in 1947, in Waterbury, Connecticut.

== Paintings ==
Haynes is a conceptual artist. Her art-historical influences cite Marcel Duchamp, Mondrian, Dan Flavin, On Kawara and Ad Reinhardt, but as Marjorie Welish noted in her essay, “Nancy Haynes, A Literature of Silence”, Haynes’ also has influences from literature.

In Haynes’ recent paintings, the canvases began to “evolve from a paler shade of a given pigment to a darker one, creating a horizontal movement that pulls the eye toward an unseen source of light.”

More notable works include her autobiographical color charts series (2005–2013), which employ swatches of color contained within grids, meant to give an autobiography of the artist.

== Exhibitions ==
Haynes began exhibiting her work in the late 1970s and has since held numerous solo exhibitions. Selected solo exhibitions are below:

- Compressing Light, Galerie Thomas Schulte, Berlin, Germany, 2025
- A madeleine dipped in ink, Galerie Hubert Winter, Vienna, Austria, 2022
- Paintings: to the poets, Galerie Hubert Winter, Vienna, Austria, 2017
- Nancy Haynes: this painting oil on linen, Regina Rex, New York, 2017
- Nancy Haynes: anomalies and non sequiturs, Regina Rex, New York, 2015
- Nancy Haynes: Recent Paintings, George Lawson Gallery, Los Angeles, 2012
- Selected Small Paintings, George Lawson Gallery, San Francisco, 2020
- Dissolution, Elizabeth Harris Gallery, New York, 2009
- Nancy Haynes, Galerie Hubert Winter, Vienna, Austria, 2006
- Nancy Haynes, Galerie Hubert Winter, Vienna, Austria, 2002
- Between Two Appearances, Stark Gallery, New York, 2000
- Nancy Haynes, Galerie Hubert Winter, Vienna, Austria, 1998

== Teaching and lectures ==
In addition to her painting career, Haynes has contributed to the academic field through teaching and lectures. She served as a visiting lecturer at Princeton University in 2000 and lectured at the Carpenter Center at Harvard University in 1992. From 1986 to 1989, she was an adjunct lecturer at Hunter College in New York.

== Awards ==
Haynes has been awarded by the Pollock-Krasner Foundation in 1995, The National Endowment for the Arts in 1987 and again in 1990, and the New York Foundation for the Arts in 1987.

== Public collections ==
Her work is included in museum collections, including:

- Metropolitan Museum of Art in New York
- Museum of Modern Art in New York
- Whitney Museum of American Art in New York
- Brooklyn Museum in Brooklyn, New York
- Hood Museum of Art in Dartmouth, NH
- Addison Gallery of American Art at the Phillips Academy in Andover, MA
- Delaware Art Museum in Wilmington, Delaware
- Bonnefantenmuseum in Maastricht, Netherlands
- Kunstmuseum Den Haag at The Hague, Netherlands
- National Gallery of Art in Washington, D.C.
- Museum of Fine Arts in Houston, TX
- Ackland Art Museum in Chapel Hill, NC
- Chrysler Museum of Art in Norfolk, VA
- Rose Art Museum at Brandeis University in Waltham, MA
- Harvard Art Museums at Harvard University in Cambridge, MA
- Davis Museum at Wellesley College in Wellesley, MA
- UCLA Hammer Museum in Los Angeles, CA
