= Fitzhamon =

Fitzhamon is a surname. Notable people with the surname include:

- Robert Fitzhamon (died 1107), Norman noble
- Mabel FitzHamon of Gloucester (c. 1100–1157), Anglo-Norman noblewoman
- Lewin Fitzhamon (1869–1961), British filmmaker
