= Stephen Haines (neurosurgeon) =

American Neurosurgeon

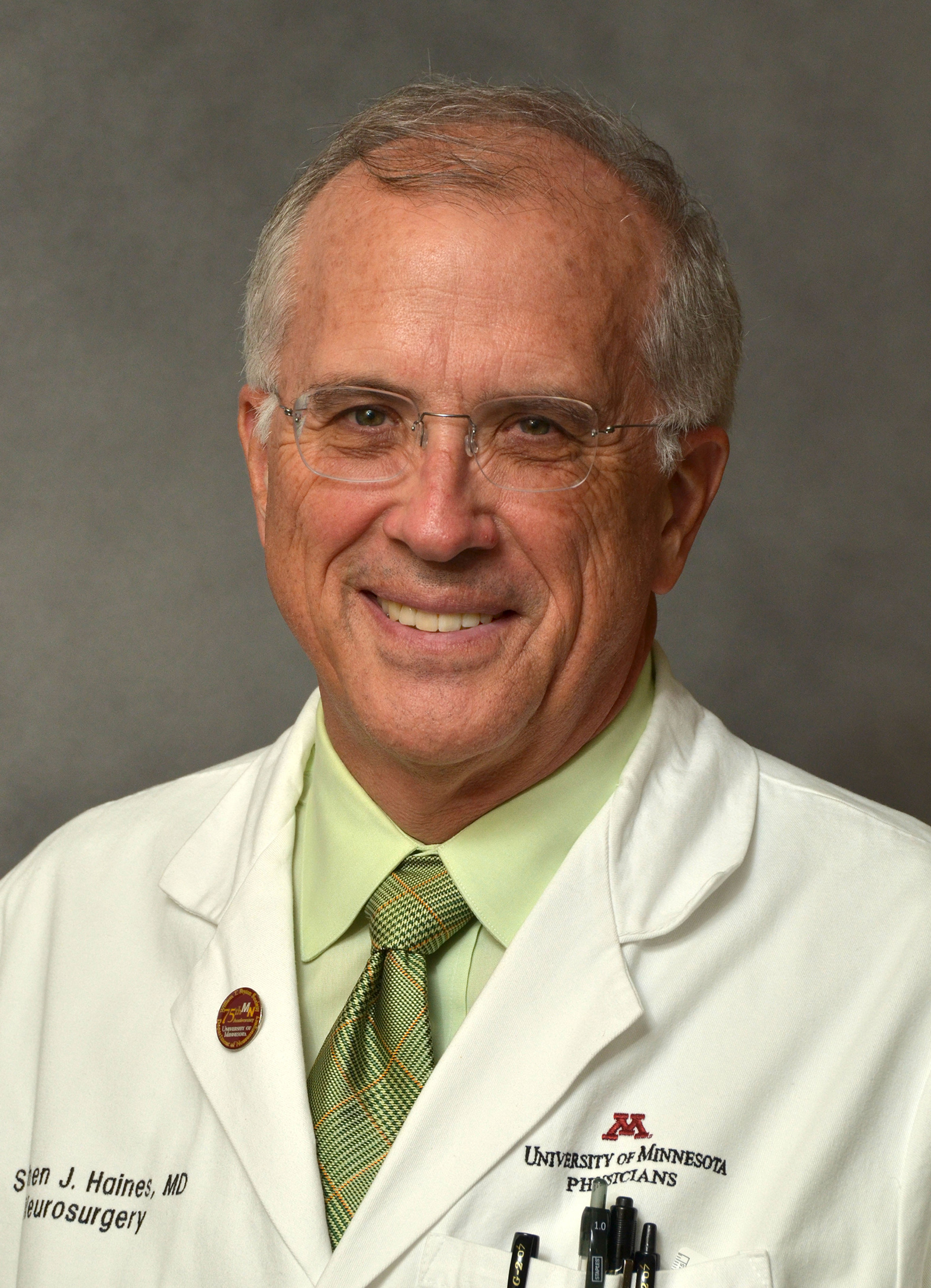
- Occupations: Neurosurgeon and academic

Academic background
- Education: A.B. Dartmouth College; M.D. University of Vermont

Academic work
- Institutions: University of Minnesota

Stephen J. Haines is a neurosurgeon and academic. He is Emeritus Professor at the University of Minnesota.

Haines' clinical practice has concentrated on cranial nerve disorders, primarily trigeminal neuralgia, skull base surgery, and pediatric neurosurgery. His research has centered on evidence-based neurosurgery and outcomes analysis broadly applied to neurosurgery and spinal surgery. He was a Van Wagenen Fellow of the American Association of Neurological Surgeons and served as the president of the Congress of Neurological Surgeons in 1996.

== Education ==
Haines earned an A.B. in Mathematics and Social Sciences at Dartmouth College in 1971, followed by an M.D. at the University of Vermont. He then completed his residency in Neurosurgery at the University of Pittsburgh in 1981. Afterwards, he completed a research fellowship in clinical trials at Oxford University.

== Career ==
Haines began his academic career at the University of Minnesota, initially as an assistant professor in 1982, becoming an associate professor in 1987 and a professor in 1993. Concurrently, he worked as the head of the Division of Pediatric Neurosurgery from 1985 to 1997. In 1997, he joined the Medical University of South Carolina (MUSC) as the chairman and a professor of the Department of Neurological Surgery, and also co-directed the Neuroscience Institute from 1999 to 2003. He left the MUSC after being appointed as chairman at the University of Minnesota in 2003 and as the Lyle A. French Professor and head of the Department of Neurosurgery, remaining in that role until 2017. He also held adjunct appointments in the Departments of Pediatrics and Otolaryngology during his time at the University of Minnesota. Since 2020, he has been an emeritus professor at the University of Minnesota.

Haines has been president of the Congress of Neurological Surgeons in 1996 and president of the Neurosurgical Society of America in 2013. He was also a part of the Editorial Review Board of Neurosurgery.

== Research ==
Haines' research includes peer-reviewed articles and book chapters, and has co-edited neurosurgical textbooks, including Evidence-based Neurosurgery. His work involves the use of research design, including randomized clinical trials, systematic reviews, and outcomes analysis. He has also explored neurosurgical interventions as well as patient care within the discipline.

A significant component of Haines's research addresses long-term outcomes following neurosurgical procedures. He has contributed to studies examining postoperative results and complication rates, intending to assess the effectiveness and durability of different surgical techniques. His research has also focused on external validation of prognostic models using RCT data, assessing prediction accuracy and calibration across diverse populations.

== Awards and honors ==
- 1981 – Van Wagenen Fellow, American Association of Neurological Surgeons
- 2019 – NSA Medal, Neurological Society of America
- 2025 – Ranked second in antibiotic prophylaxis, ScholarGPS

== Selected articles ==
- Haines, Stephen J. (1983). "Randomied Clinical Trials in Neurosurgery". Neurosurgery. 12 (3): 259–264. doi:10.1227/00006123-198303000-00001. PMID 6843795.
- Haines, SJ (1992). "Antibiotic prophylaxis in neurosurgery. The controlled trials". Neurosurgery Clinics of North America. 3 (2): 355–358. doi:10.1016/S1042-3680(18)30667-3. PMID 1633465.
- Sanan, Abhay; Haines, Stephen J. (1997). "Repairing Holes in the Head: A History of Cranioplasty". Neurosurgery. 40 (3): 588–603. doi:10.1097/00006123-199703000-00033. PMID 9055300.
- Drake, James M.; Kestle, John R.W.; Milner, Ruth; Cinalli, Giuseppe; Boop, Frederick; Piatt, Joseph; Haines, Stephen; Schiff, Steven J. (1998). "Randomized Trial of Cerebrospinal Fluid Shunt Valve Design in Pediatric Hydrocephalus". Neurosurgery. 43 (2): 294–303. doi:10.1097/00006123-199808000-00068. PMID 9696082.
- Rush, A.John; George, Mark S; Sackeim, Harold A; Marangell, Lauren B; Husain, Mustafa M; Giller, Cole; Nahas, Ziad; Haines, Stephen; Simpson, Richard K; Goodman, Robert (2000). "Vagus nerve stimulation (VNS) for treatment-resistant depressions: a multicenter study". Biological Psychiatry. 47 (4): 276–286. doi:10.1016/S0006-3223(99)00304-2. PMID 10686262.
- Sackeim, H (2001). "Vagus Nerve Stimulation (VNS™) for Treatment-Resistant Depression Efficacy, Side Effects, and Predictors of Outcome". Neuropsychopharmacology. 25 (5): 713–728. doi:10.1016/S0893-133X(01)00271-8. PMID 11682255.
- Haines, SJ (2003). "Evidence-based neurosurgery". Neurosurgery. 52 (1): 36–47, discussion 47. doi:10.1097/00006123-200301000-00004. PMID 12493099.
- Bullock, M Ross; Chesnut, Randall; Ghajar, Jamshid; Gordon, David; Hartl, Roger; Newell, David W.; Servadei, Franco; Walters, Beverly C.; Wilberger, Jack (2006). "Surgical Management of Traumatic Parenchymal Lesions". Neurosurgery. 58 (suppl_3): S2–25–S2-46. doi:10.1227/01.NEU.0000210365.36914.E3. PMID 16540746.
