= Hopton Haynes =

English writer and Royal Mint employee

Hopton Haynes (1667–1749) was an English employee of the Royal Mint and theological writer.

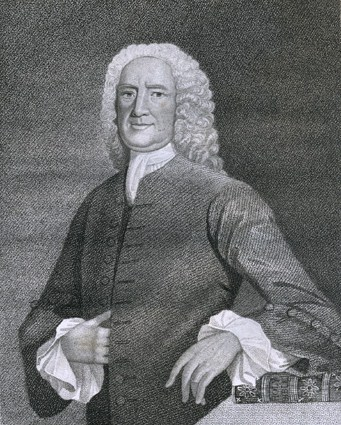
Hopton Haynes

== Life ==
Born about 1672, Haynes entered the service of the Mint as weigher and teller in 1696 or early in 1697, almost at the same time as Isaac Newton's appointment as Warden. He was promoted to be assay-master in 1723. Haynes was close to Newton, who died in 1727.

In April 1737, after forty years in the Mint, Haynes was allowed to appoint a deputy. He retired on full pension, 8 February 1749, retaining the auditorship of the tally office in the exchequer.

It was through Haynes that William Whiston, in 1712, communicated with Newton on the subject of baptism. Richard Baron described Haynes as a Unitarian. He attended the services of the Church of England, sitting down at certain parts till Samuel Say told him his practice was inconsistent, and he never again attended a place of worship.

Haynes died at Queen Square, Westminster, on 19 November 1749, aged 77.

== Works ==
Haynes published:

- A Brief Enquiry relative to the Right of His Majesty's Royal Chapel … within the Tower, 1728.
- Causa Dei contra Novatores; or the Religion of the Bible and … the Pulpit compared. In a Letter to the Revd. Mr. Wilson, 1747, (anonymous).

Posthumous was:

- The Scripture Account of … God; and … Christ, 1750 (edited by John Blackburn, presbyterian minister of King John's Court, Bermondsey, later of Newbury, Berkshire, died January 1762); 2nd edition 1790 (edited by Theophilus Lindsey); 3rd edition, 1797; 4th edition, Hackney, 1815, with memoir by Robert Aspland.

Haynes translated into Latin, some time after 1708, Newton's two letters on the textual criticism of 1 John v. 7, 8, and 1 Tim. iii. 16.

== Family ==
Haynes was married three times, and had several children by his second wife, Elisabeth Mein, of whom Samuel Haynes was the eldest. His third wife was Mary Jocelyn (d. 22 September 1750, aged 65), a member of Say's congregation.

== Notes ==
Attribution

This article incorporates text from a publication now in the public domain: Stephen, Leslie; Lee, Sidney, eds. (1891). "Haynes, Hopton". Dictionary of National Biography. Vol. 25. London: Smith, Elder & Co.
