= Madlyn L. Hanes =

American academic

Madlyn Hanes

Vice President of Pennsylvania State University Commonwealth Campuses
- In office 2010–2021

Chancellor of Penn State Harrisburg
- In office 2000–2010
- Succeeded by: Mikund Kulkarni

Personal details
- Born: 1948 (age 77–78)
- Education: University of Florida

Madlyn L. Hanes (born 1948) is an American academic, and the former Vice President of Pennsylvania State University Commonwealth Campuses. Hanes also previously served as Chancellor of Penn State Harrisburg and as the chief academic officer for both Penn State Great Valley and Penn State Brandywine.

Hanes graduated with her bachelor's degree in English education from the University of Florida in 1969. She also received her master's degree in Speech-Language Pathology and her Doctorate in curriculum and instruction from the University of Florida.
