= Job Haines =

American politician (1744–1812)

Member of the Maryland House of Delegates

Personal details
- Born: August 26, 1744; Rising Sun, Province of Maryland
- Died: October 4, 1812 (aged 68); Rising Sun, Maryland, U.S.
- Spouse: Esther Kirk (m. 1766)
- Children: 12
- Occupation: Politician; farmer

Job Haines (August 26, 1744 – October 4, 1812) was an American politician from Maryland. He served as a member of the Maryland House of Delegates.

== Early life ==
Job Haines was born on August 26, 1744, in Rising Sun, Maryland, to Elizabeth (née Thomas) and Joseph Haines. His father was justice of the peace in Chester County, Pennsylvania.

== Career ==
Haines owned and farmed tracts of land in Cecil County. In 1781, he hosted Marquis de Lafayette at his home as Lafayette traveled to Yorktown.

Haines served as a member of the Maryland House of Delegates.

== Personal life ==
In 1766, Haines married Esther Kirk, daughter of Ann Gatchell and Timothy Haines. They had 12 children, Jacon, Timothy, Isaac, Reuben, Joseph, Eli, Job, Lewis, Elizabeth, Esther, Elisha and Nathan. His grandson L. Marshall Haines was a politician and lawyer.

Haines died on October 4, 1812, in Rising Sun.
