= Percy Haynes =

Canadian musician (1911–1992)

Piercy Augustus "Percy" Haynes (1911 – 24 July 1992) was a Canadian musician.

Haynes was born in British Guiana and emigrated to Canada at an early age. He was a strong all-around athlete, winning local championships in track and field, basketball (as a member of the Winnipeg Stellars), and softball. He was the Winnipeg amateur welterweight boxing champion in 1933 and 1934. During the Second World War he was refused enlistment because of his race, but appealed this rule and became the first Black Canadian naval serviceman of the modern era. In 1943 he married jazz singer Zena Bradshaw.

After his naval service he became a night porter with the Canadian Pacific Railway while also performing as a pianist. His wife opened Haynes Chicken Shack in 1952; in addition to Haynes, other performers at the venue included Billy Daniels, Oscar Peterson, and Harry Belafonte. He ran as a candidate in the 1977 provincial and 1980 municipal elections. He died on 24 July 1992.
