= John Hanes =

John Hanes may refer to:

- John Wesley Hanes I (1850–1903), American businessman, founder of Hanes Hosiery Mills
- John Wesley Hanes II (1892–1987), American finance specialist, statesman
- John Wesley Hanes III (1925–2018), American civil servant
- John Hanes (audio engineer), American audio engineer

== See also ==
- John Haines (disambiguation)
- John Haynes (disambiguation)
