= Meir Ba'al HaNes =

Meir Ba'al HaNes (Hebrew: מאיר בעל הנס, lit. 'Meir the miracle maker') refers to the Tanna Rabbi Meir

It may also refer to a number of charitable organizations named after him:

- Colel Chabad, Ma'ot Eretz Hakodesh
- Kolel Chibas Yerushalayim, Tzidkat Rab Meir Baal Haness
- Kollel Shomrei HaChomos, Tzidkat Rabbi Meir Baal Haness
- Kupath Rabbi Meir Baal Haness, Kolel Polen
