= Hunter Haynes =

American entrepreneur and film producer

Hunter C. Haynes (1867 – January 1, 1918) was an American barber, entrepreneur and inventor. He was an innovator of strops to sharpen razor blades, founded a barbershop supply company, and was a film producer and film company founder. His parents had been enslaved for part of their lives. He established Haynes Photoplay Company after working as a producer at the white-owned Afro-American Film Company. He was lauded as a Black filmmaker.

He was born in Selma, Alabama. His parents were William Haines, a laborer, and Silvia Haines, a seamstress.

Afflicted with tuberculosis, he resided in Saranac, New York to recuperate but died on New Year's Day of 1918. He was buried in his hometown of Selma, Alabama.

== Career ==
Haynes became a barber's apprentice at the age of fourteen. By twenty-seven he owned a barbershop in Selma, Alabama. Haynes dabbled in entrepreneurship when he began developing a chemical treatment to make razor strops more effective and easier to use. Pre-treated strops, such as those marketed by Haynes rose in popularity during the early twentieth century. Knowledge of these treatments was often proprietary but Haynes assured customers that his strops were subject to rigorous personal inspection before they were approved. By using his strops to refurbish discarded straight razors, Haynes began a successful business selling his products to independent barbers. In 1904 he founded The Haynes Razor Strop Co. in Chicago.

== Filmography ==
- Lovie Joe's Romance (1914)
- One Large Evening (1914)
- Uncle Remus' First Visit to New York (1914)

== See also ==
- African American cinema
