= Edward G. Hayne =

American businessman and politician

Edward G. Hayne (January 21, 1874 – September 30, 1945) was an American businessman and politician.

Hayne was born in Ottawa, Illinois and went to the Ottawa public schools. He was involved in the heating, plumbing, and lighting business in Ottawa, Illinois. He served in the Illinois House of Representatives from 1935 until his death in 1945 and was a Democrat. Hayne died at the Illinois Research Hospital in Chicago, Illinois after undergoing surgery.
