= Carleton Haynes =

English cricketer

Carleton Haynes (7 February 1858 – 20 November 1945) was an English first-class cricketer. He was a right-handed batsman and a right-arm fast bowler who played from 1878 to 1879 for Gloucestershire County Cricket Club. Haynes was born at St John, Barbados.

Haynes made 5 first-class appearances, scoring 76 runs @ 9.50 with a highest innings of 21. He held 3 catches and took 1 wicket @ 38.00 with a best analysis of 1–8.

Haynes died at Woodlands, Hampshire on 20 November 1945.
