= Thomas Haynes (burgess) =

American politician

Member Virginia House of Burgesses for Warwick County, Virginia
- In office 1736–1740 Serving with William Roscow
- Preceded by: William Harwood
- Succeeded by: William Harwood

Personal details
- Occupation: Planter, politician

Thomas Haynes was a member of the Virginia House of Burgesses, the elected lower house of the colonial Virginia General Assembly, from Warwick County, from 1736 to 1740.
