= John Haines (cricketer) =

English cricketer

John Haines (c. 1825 – 27 May 1894) was an English first-class cricketer active 1865–67 who played for Middlesex. He was born and died in St Pancras. He played in two first-class matches.
