= Three Rivers Municipal Dr. Haines Airport =

Public use airport in Three Rivers, Michigan

Three Rivers Municipal Dr. Haines Airport (ICAO: KHAI, FAA LID: HAI) is a public-use airport located two miles northeast of Three Rivers, Michigan. It is publicly owned by the city and covers 305 acres.

In 2008, the airport was a source of controversy regarding a worker strike at American Axle & Manufacturing. The company's workers were on strike, and the company requested to use the airport as a parking lot for replacement workers.

The airport was a stop for a team from Western Michigan University on the Air Race Classic, a cross-country flying race for women.

== Facilities and aircraft ==
The airport has two paved runways. Runway 9/27 is 4000 x 75 ft (1219 x 23 m), and runway 5/23 is 2719 x 60 ft (829 x 18 m).

The airport has a fixed-base operator that offers services such as aircraft maintenance, flight instruction, and aircraft rental. Both avgas and jet fuel are available.

For the 12-month period ending December 31, 2018, the airport had almost 10,000 aircraft operations, an average of 27 per day. It was composed entirely of general aviation. For the same time, there were 37 aircraft based at the airport: 34 single-engine and 3 multi-engine airplanes.

== Accidents and incidents ==
- On April 23, 2003, a Cessna 150 received substantial damage when it veered off the runway during the takeoff portion of a touch and go landing at Three Rivers Municipal. The student pilot aboard was on their second solo flight. On the rollout after landing, the pilot advanced the throttle and carburetor heat at the same time while subsequently pushing in on the yoke and raising the flaps to prepare for takeoff again. The plane swerved left and the pilot reduced the throttle and applied the brakes, but the airplane swerved and lost control; it then veered off the left side of the runway, hit a sign, and flipped over. The probable cause of the accident was the pilot's failure to maintain directional control.
- On April 11, 2010, a Piper PA-28 Cherokee sustained substantial damage during landing at Three Rivers Municipal. After touchdown, the aircraft veered left, and the flight instructor aboard corrected with right rudder thinking the student had applied left brake. However, the airplane continued to veer to the left, and the right wing struck the terrain. The airplane continued off the runway and came to rest in a field. NTSB Materials Laboratory examination of the torque link revealed the fracture face contained crack arrest marks typical of fatigue cracking that emanated from multiple origins at the surface of the wall on both sides of the link. The probable cause was found to be the pilot's inability to maintain directional control during landing due to the failure of the left main landing gear torque link as a result of fatigue.
- On May 1, 2012, a Cessna 172 Skyhawk was damaged when it impacted a deer during a touch-and-go at Three Rivers.
- On February 19, 2017, a Cessna 182 was damaged during a hard landing at Three Rivers. The pilot reported that, after clearing some electrical wires on final approach, he reduced the throttle to idle. He further reported that the airspeed became low and the airplane landed hard, bounced twice, and the nose landing gear collapsed. The airplane nosed over and came to rest inverted. The probable cause was found to be the pilot's failure to maintain sufficient airspeed during the landing flare, which resulted in a hard landing and a nose-over.
- On August 19, 2020, an American Champion 8GCBC Scout collided with a taxiway sign after landing at Three Rivers. The airplane nosed over, substantially damaging the vertical stabilizer and rudder.

== See also ==
- List of airports in Michigan
