= Jim Haines =

Australian rules footballer

Personal information
- Full name: James William Haines
- Born: 20 December 1945 (age 80)
- Original team: East Perth
- Height: 185 cm (6 ft 1 in)
- Weight: 81 kg (179 lb)

Playing career^{1}
Years	Club	Games (Goals)
1965–70	East Perth	106 (2)
1971–72	South Melbourne	19 (2)
- ^{1} Playing statistics correct to the end of 1972.

James William Haines (born 20 December 1945) is a former Australian rules footballer who played with South Melbourne in the Victorian Football League (VFL).
