= John Sydney Haines =

John Sydney Haines AM (26 January 1937 – 22 August 2009) was an Australian boat builder and racer, founder of Haines Hunter boats in the 1960s and The Haines Group in 1984. The Haines Group manufactured thousands of Signature fiberglass trailer-boats using John's cutting edge designs and worldwide patented Signature Variable Deadrise Hull. Haines also raced his boats, winning many powerboat races and several state and national titles.
