= Henry Botting Haynes =

Henry Botting Haynes (20 September 1870 – 1942) was an Australian Anglican priest in the first half of the 20th century.

Haynes was born in Stepney, Adelaide to Thomas Crofts Haynes and Mary Anne Bax. He was educated at Moore College and ordained in 1900. He served curacies in Sydney and Swan Hill; and incumbencies at Kyabram then Bendigo. He was the Archdeacon of Kyneton from 1914 to 1917; and of The Murray from 1917 to 1924. He died at Naracoorte, South Australia in 1942.
