= James Haynes (cricketer) =

English cricketer (born 1972)

Personal information
- Full name: James Edward Haynes
- Born: 29 September 1972 (age 54); Nottingham, Nottinghamshire, England
- Batting: Right-handed
- Bowling: Right-arm off break

Domestic team information
- Years: Team
- 1997: Oxford University

Career statistics
Competition	First-class
Matches	2
Runs scored	13
Batting average	3.25
100s/50s	–/–
Top score	9
Catches/stumpings	–/–
- Source: Cricinfo, 4 May 2020

James Edward Haynes (born 29 September 1972) is an English former first-class cricketer.

Haynes was born at Nottingham. He later studied at Linacre College at the University of Oxford. While studying at Oxford, he played first-class cricket for Oxford University in 1997, making two appearances against Durham and Hampshire, scoring 13 runs.
