= John Haynes Jr. =

American physician (1937–2021)

Dr. John Haynes Jr.
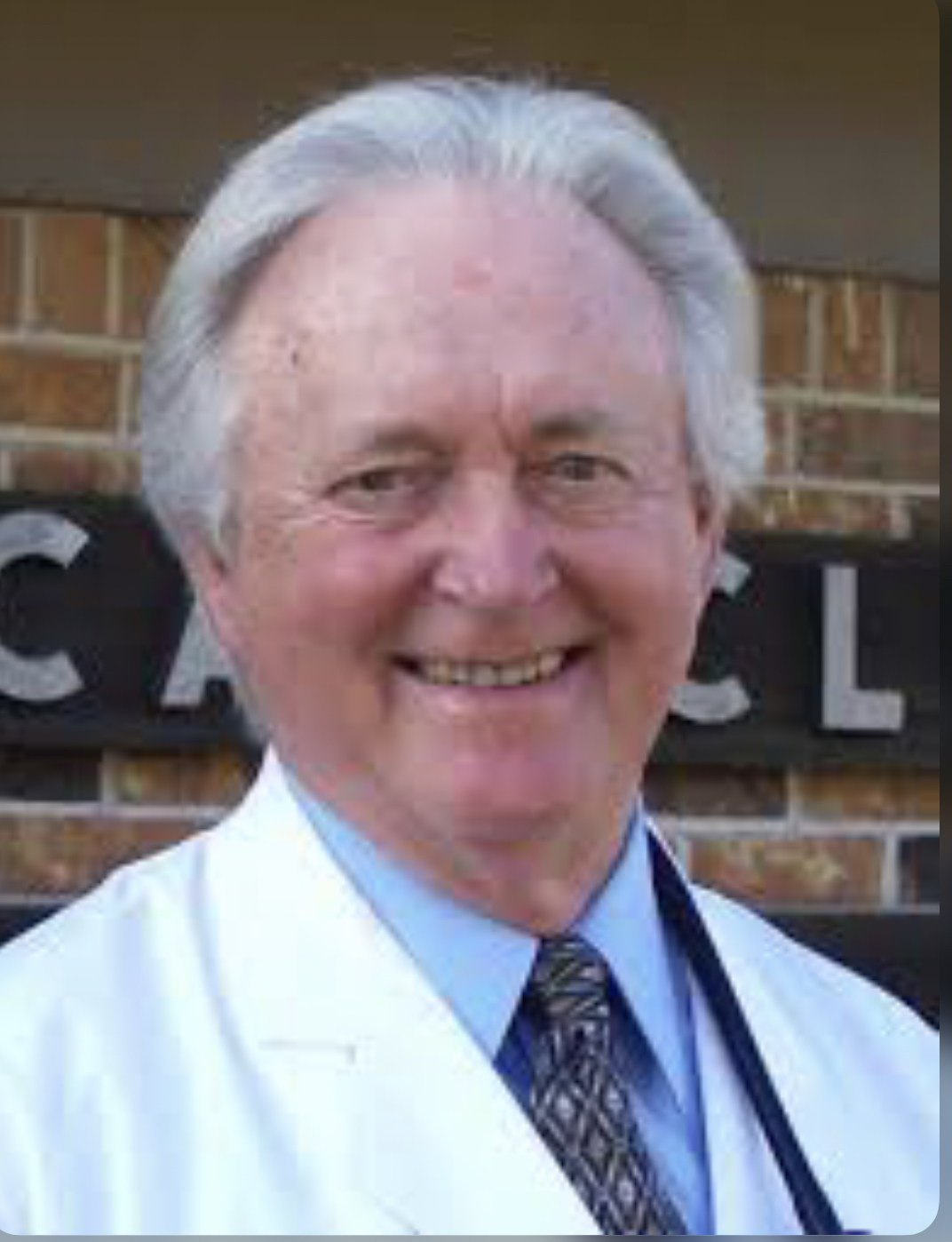
- Born: March 7, 1937; Bloomburg, Texas
- Died: June 7, 2021 (aged 84)
- Education: Centenary College of Louisiana; University of Texas
- Occupations: Family physician, surgeon

John Haynes Jr. (born March 7, 1937 – June 7, 2021) was a rural family physician and surgeon, and community leader of Northwest Louisiana and Northeast Texas. who was chosen as the first Country Doctor of the Year in 1993 for his contributions to rural health care. Haynes died June 7, 2021, of cardiovascular disease.

Haynes received his Bachelor of Science from Centenary College, his medical degree from University of Texas Medical Branch School in Galveston, and completed his internship and residency at John Peter Smith Hospital in Fort Worth, Texas. He became the Chief of Staff at North Caddo Memorial Hospital in Vivian, Louisiana, in 1966. He later became a founding member of the American Board of Family Medicine. In 1993 he founded the Rural Family Practice Fellowship and residency in conjunction with Willis-Knighton Health System and Louisiana State University Medical Center School of Medicine in Shreveport, LA. He was on the faculty of Family Medicine at LSU Medical School in Shreveport.

In 1966, he began his medical practice in Vivian, Louisiana, and became chief of staff at North Caddo Memorial Hospital,

Haynes was also chosen as the Louisiana Family Practitioner of the Year in 1998 and 2004 and the Louisiana Rural Practitioner of the Year award in 1998 and 2009. His publications include "Laparoscopic cholecystectomy in a Rural Family Practice: The Vivian, LA Experience" in the Journal of Family Practice 2004. Haynes trained thousands of medical students and physician residents in the field of rural family medicine.

A USA Today article from 1993 described Haynes as "a cross between Marcus Welby and John Wayne."
