= Dick Haynes =

American actor (1911–1980)

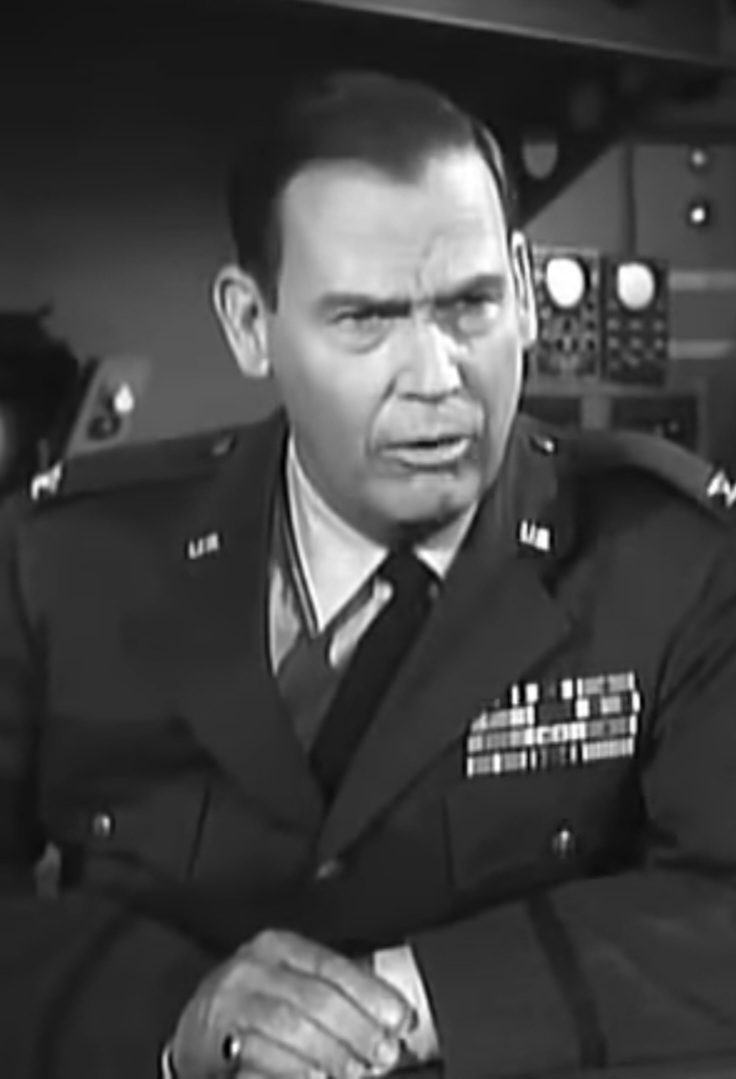
- Haynes in The Phantom Planet (1961)
- Born: January 9, 1911
- Died: November 24, 1980 (aged 69); Woodland Hills, Los Angeles, California, U.S.
- Occupation(s): Actor, radio announcer
- Years active: 1949–1980

Dick Haynes (January 9, 1911 – November 24, 1980) was an American actor and radio personality. He had minor roles in films and television that began with an uncredited appearance as a reporter in the 1954 MGM film, Tennessee Champ. His final role was as "Grandpa" in the 1980 film Getting Wasted, shortly before his death from cancer.

== Career ==
His most significant roles were three guest star appearances on television shows during the 1960s, starting with portraying Phillips in "Incident at Pawnee Gun", a 1962 episode of Frontier Circus; as Sheriff in "Four Alarm Wing Ding," a 1966 episode of The Rounders; and as Colonel Tim in "Howard, the Comedian," a 1967 episode from the 7th season of The Andy Griffith Show. He also was on the radio program Haynes at the Reins.

After he left KLAC, he spent a year at KXLA in the nearby city of Pasadena. He returned to KLAC the following year, and hosted the morning drive-time (5:30–10am) slot for the next five years before he moved to Sacramento and helped launch its popular country music station, KRAK. By 1966, he went back to southern California, and worked as the morning man at KFOX Long Beach, and then returned to KLAC, which had switched to country music, from 1971 until shortly before his death in 1980.

Haynes was recognized for his radio work by his induction into the Country Music Hall of Fame, and also has a star on Hollywood Boulevard.

== Filmography ==
- Make Believe Ballroom (1949) - Announcer (uncredited)
- The Red Badge of Courage (1951) - Confederate Soldier (uncredited)
- Washington Story (1952) - Photographer (uncredited)
- Tennessee Champ (1954) - Reporter (uncredited)
- The Fuzzy Pink Nightgown (1957) - Disc Jockey
- Don't Give Up the Ship (1959) - Captain of the USS 'Kornblatt' (uncredited)
- Last Train from Gun Hill (1959) - Townsmen (uncredited)
- The Phantom Planet (1961) - Col. Lansfield
- The Silent Witness (1962)
- A Time to Sing (1968) - Master of Ceremonies
- Support Your Local Sheriff! (1969) - Bartender
- Support Your Local Gunfighter (1971) - Bartender
- Baker's Hawk (1976) - 2nd Man
- Bad Georgia Road (1977) - C.B. Man
- Getting Wasted (1980) - Grandpa (final film role)
