= Frederick Haynes (artist) =

British artist (1832–1897)

- Born: 1832; Nottingham, England
- Died: 1897 (aged 64–65)
- Spouse: Mary Jane Haynes

Frederick Haynes (1832–1897) was a British artist born at Carrington, Nottingham who primarily painted seascapes and portraits.

Although exhibited little in his lifetime, Haynes' work is now increasingly found in auction houses. His work "a fresh breeze, shipping off the South Foreland" sold at Sotheby's London 'The Marine Sale' in 2000 for $10,866.

Haynes had a son, also called Frederick Haynes, who himself became a portrait painter and photographer.
