= Michael Haynes (cricketer) =

English cricketer

Michael William Haynes (19 May 1936 – 18 September 1997) was an English first-class cricketer active 1959–61 who played for Nottinghamshire. He was born in Sherwood; died in Nottingham.
