= Samuel Haynes (historian) =

Samuel Haynes D.D. (died 9 June 1752) was a Canon of Windsor from 1743 to 1752.

== Family ==
He was the son of Hopton Haynes, assay master of the Royal Mint.

== Career ==
He was King's Scholar at Eton College and later educated at King's College, Cambridge, where he graduated B.A. in 1724, M.A. in 1727, and D.D. in 1748.

He was admitted to Gray's Inn in 1720, and appointed tutor to James Cecil, 6th Earl of Salisbury.

He was appointed:

- Rector of Hatfield, Hertfordshire 1737–1752
- Rector of Clothall, Hertfordshire 1747–1752

He was appointed to the eleventh stall in St George's Chapel, Windsor Castle in 1743, which he held until his death in 1752.

Haynes edited the Hatfield State Papers. William Oldys wrote that he was invited to participate in the edition, but turned down the offer, because papers dealing with the young Princess Elizabeth were being censored. Haynes produced one edited volume, Collection of State Papers relating to Affairs in the Reigns of Henry VIII, Edward VI, Mary, and Elizabeth, from 1542 to 1570. Transcribed from the Original Letters and other Authentick Memorials left by W. Cecill, Lord Burghley, and now remaining at Hatfield House (1740). William Murdin produced two more (1759), running to 1612.
