= William Henry Haines =

English painter (1811–1884)

- Born: 25 December 1811; London, England
- Died: 22 June 1884 (aged 72); City of Westminster, London, England
- Known for: Landscape painting; genre painting

William Henry Haines (25 December 1811 – 22 June 1884) was an English landscape and genre painter. He exhibited paintings from 1843 until his death, sometimes under the name William Henry. He is best known for depicting scenes of Venice in the Victorian era.

== Biography ==
Haines was born in London in 1811 on Christmas day, although his birth is often mistakenly recorded as 1812. His parents were Phoebe (née Seguier) and George Hobson Haines (1780–1854), a stamp officer for the British government. His uncle, William Seguier, was an art conservator, first keeper of the National Gallery, and Surveyor of the King's Pictures. Haines and his younger brother Frederick apprenticed for their uncle together for twenty years.

In 1844, a year after his uncle's death, Haines and his brother began an art cleaning and restoration business at Bryanston Square in Westminster, operating as Messrs Haines. They continued working together until July 1857, after which the brothers began operating independently. He lived in Hampstead for a decade after 1848, briefly lived in Camden Town, and then resided in the Royal Borough of Kensington and Chelsea from 1858 to 1875 with his wife, Mary Ann Haines.

He was active in London, where he began exhibiting in 1843, specializing in landscapes, domestic scenes, and portraiture. He displayed over one hundred works at the Society of British Artists in Westminster, as well as dozens of paintings at the British Institution and Royal Academy of Arts. Haines was a prominent painter of scenes from Venice. These paintings were described by art historian Christopher Wood as being in the style of Canaletto and Francesco Guardi, painters of the Venetian school. Some of Haines's paintings were "passed off" as belonging to the two masters in later years.

His works are on display at the Victoria and Albert Museum in London, the Royal Bank of Scotland, and the Guildhall Art Gallery. In 2010, his painting Gondolas before the Campo san Zanipolo, Venice sold for a record £25,000 at Christie's in South Kensington.

He died in Westminster, London in 1884, aged 72.

== Selected paintings ==
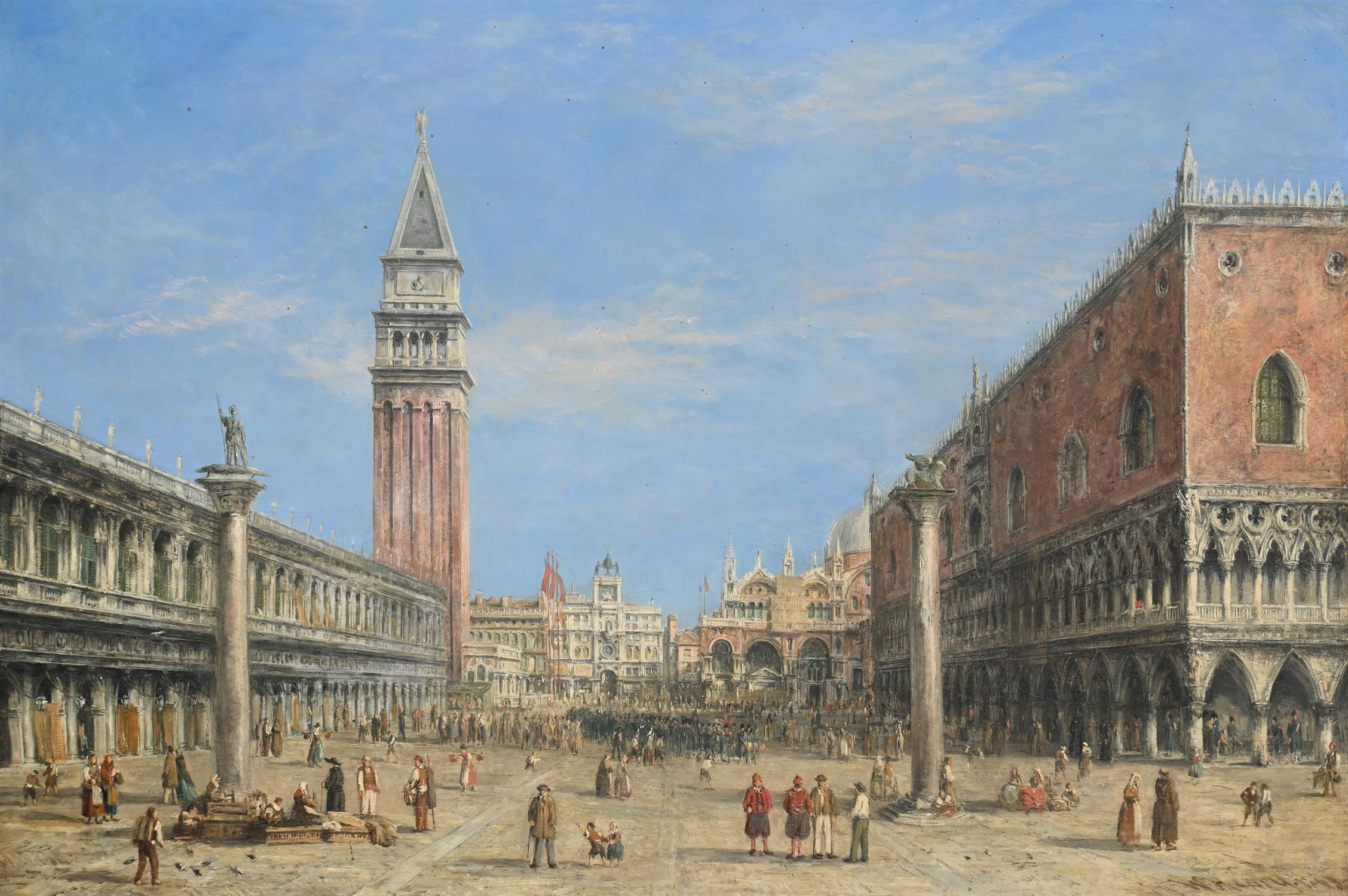
St. Mark's Square with the Doge's Palace and the Campanile

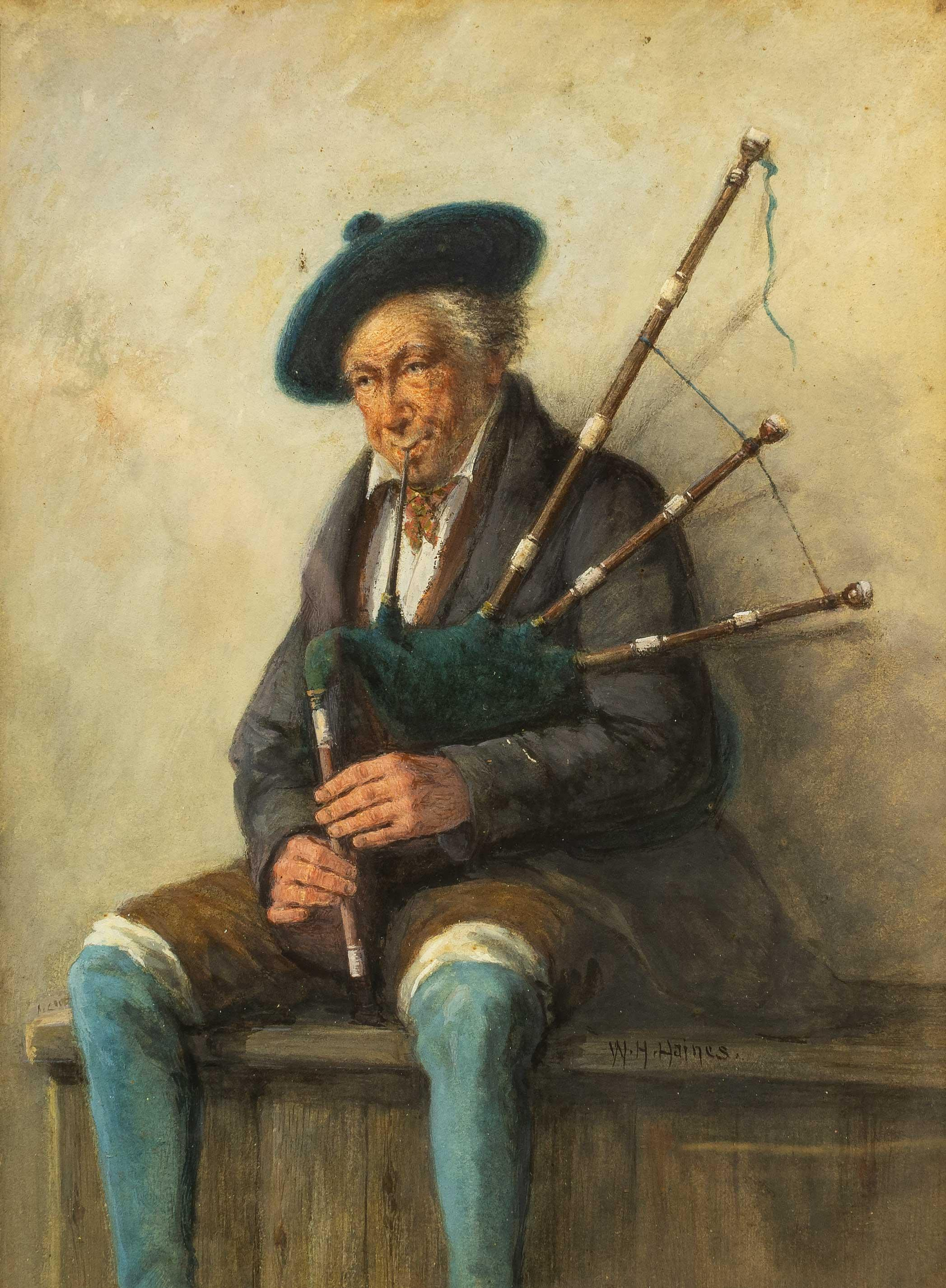
Bagpiper

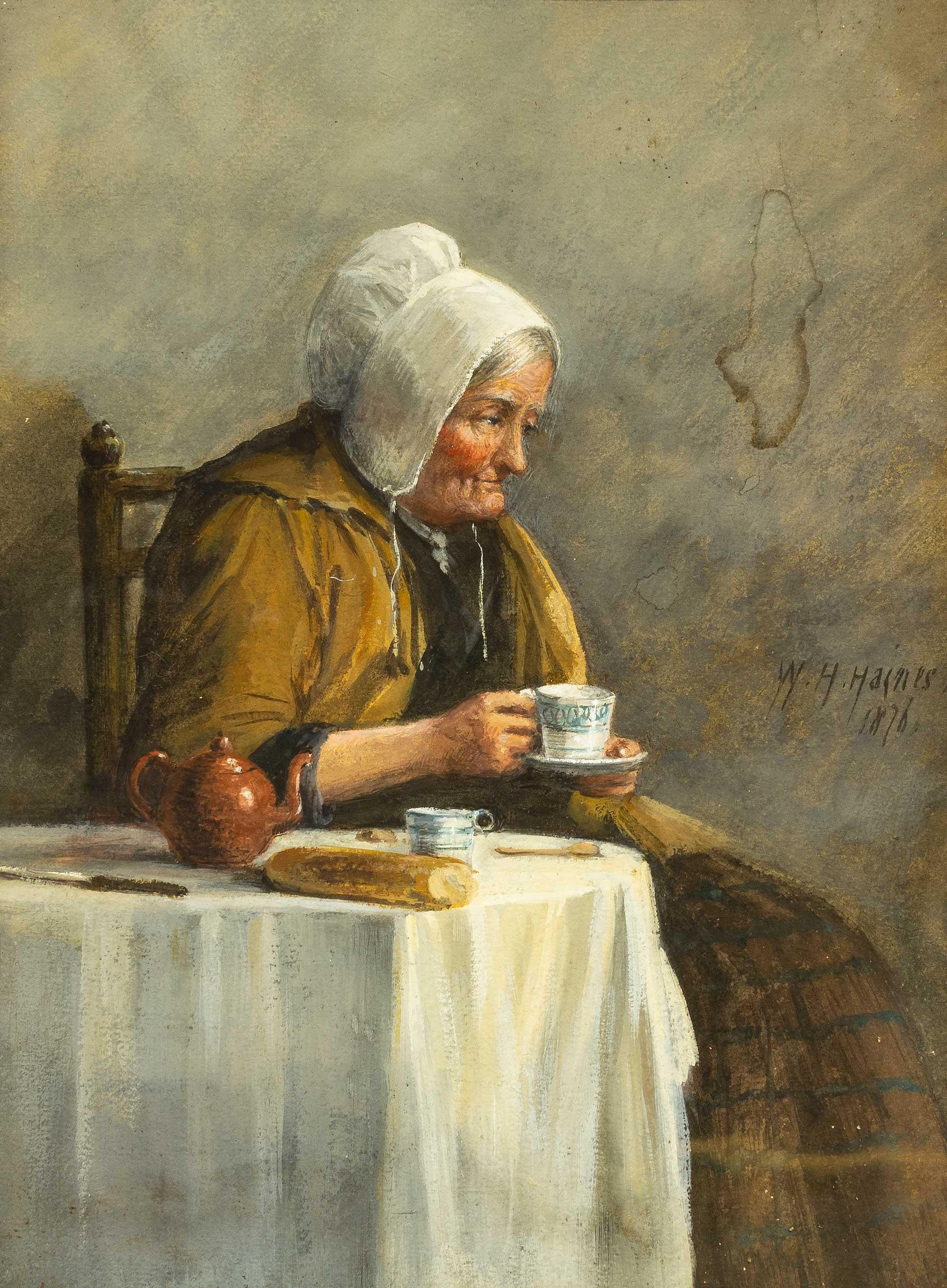
Old Lady Drinking Tea (1876)

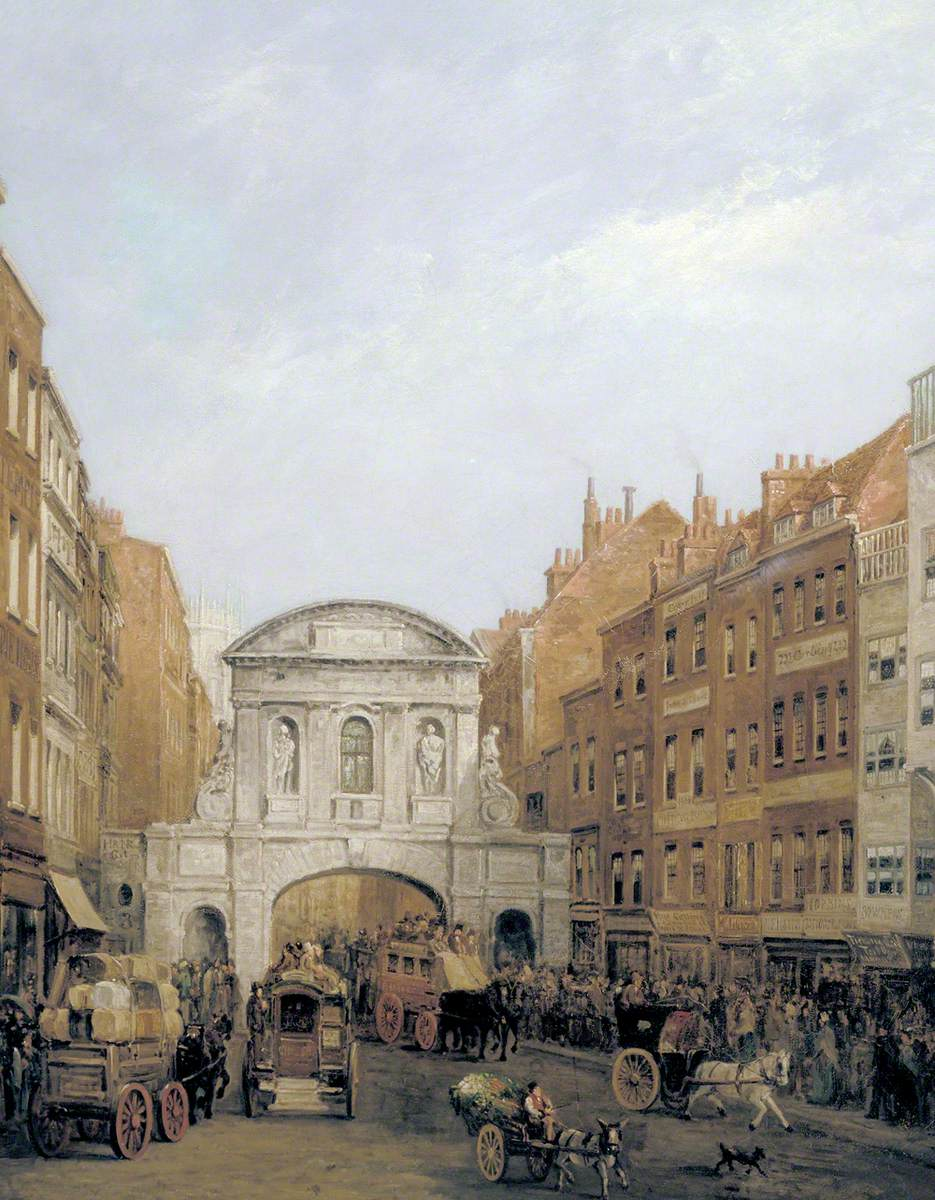
Temple Bar from the Strand, London (1878)

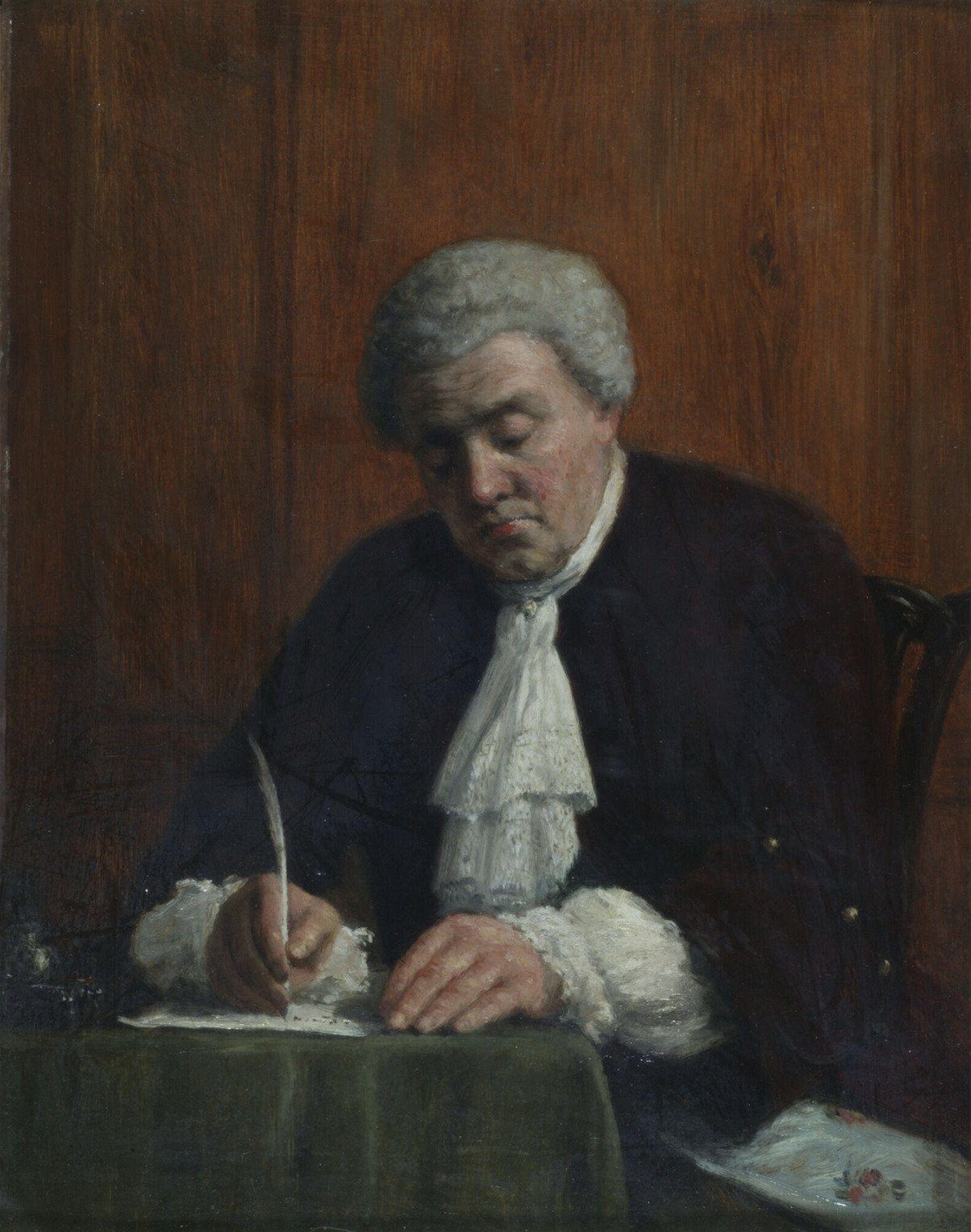
Very Important, A Man Writing at a Table (1878)

== See also ==
- Symbolism
