= Joseph Haynes (painter) =

English engraver (1760–1829)

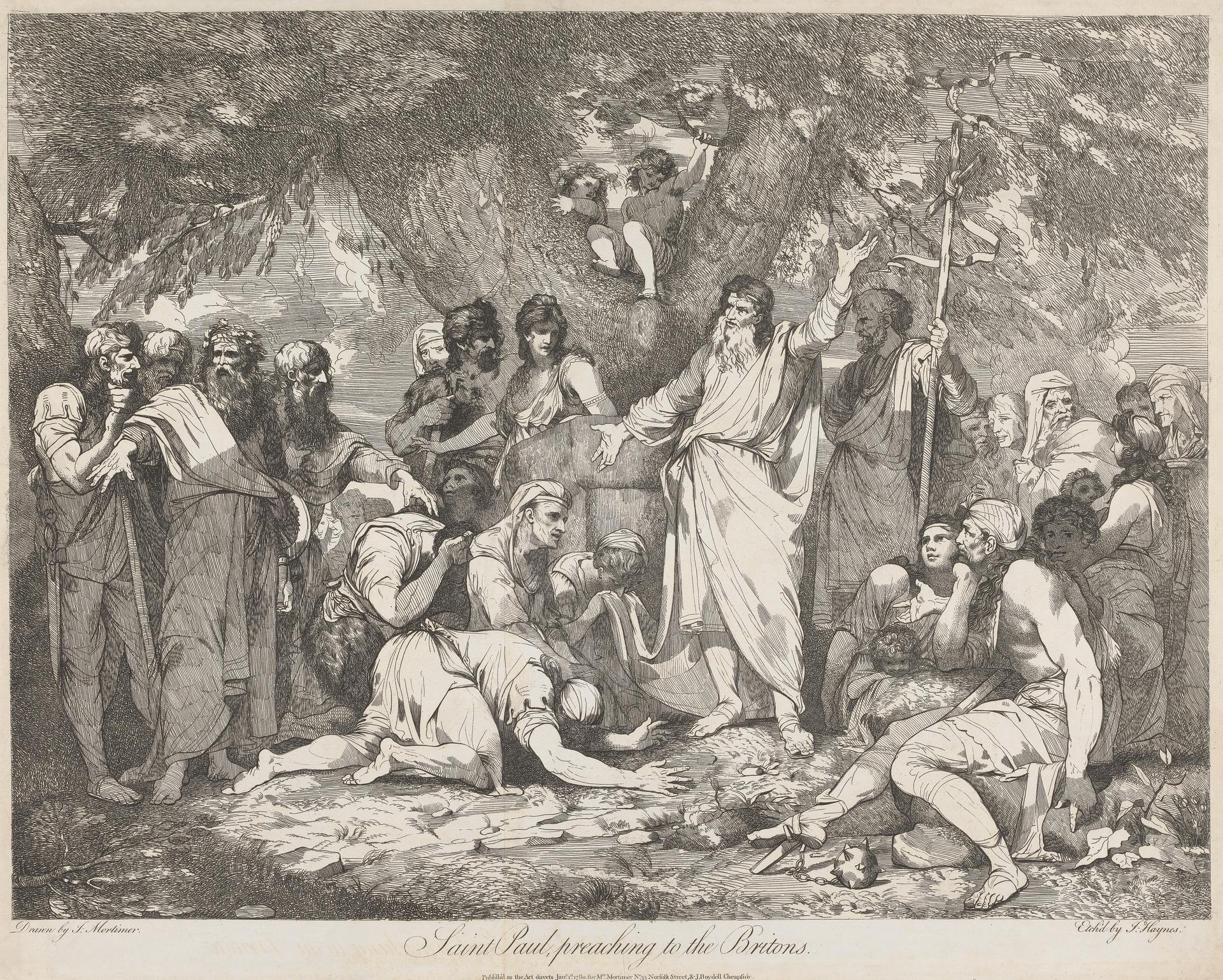
Paul Preaching to the Britons, 1780

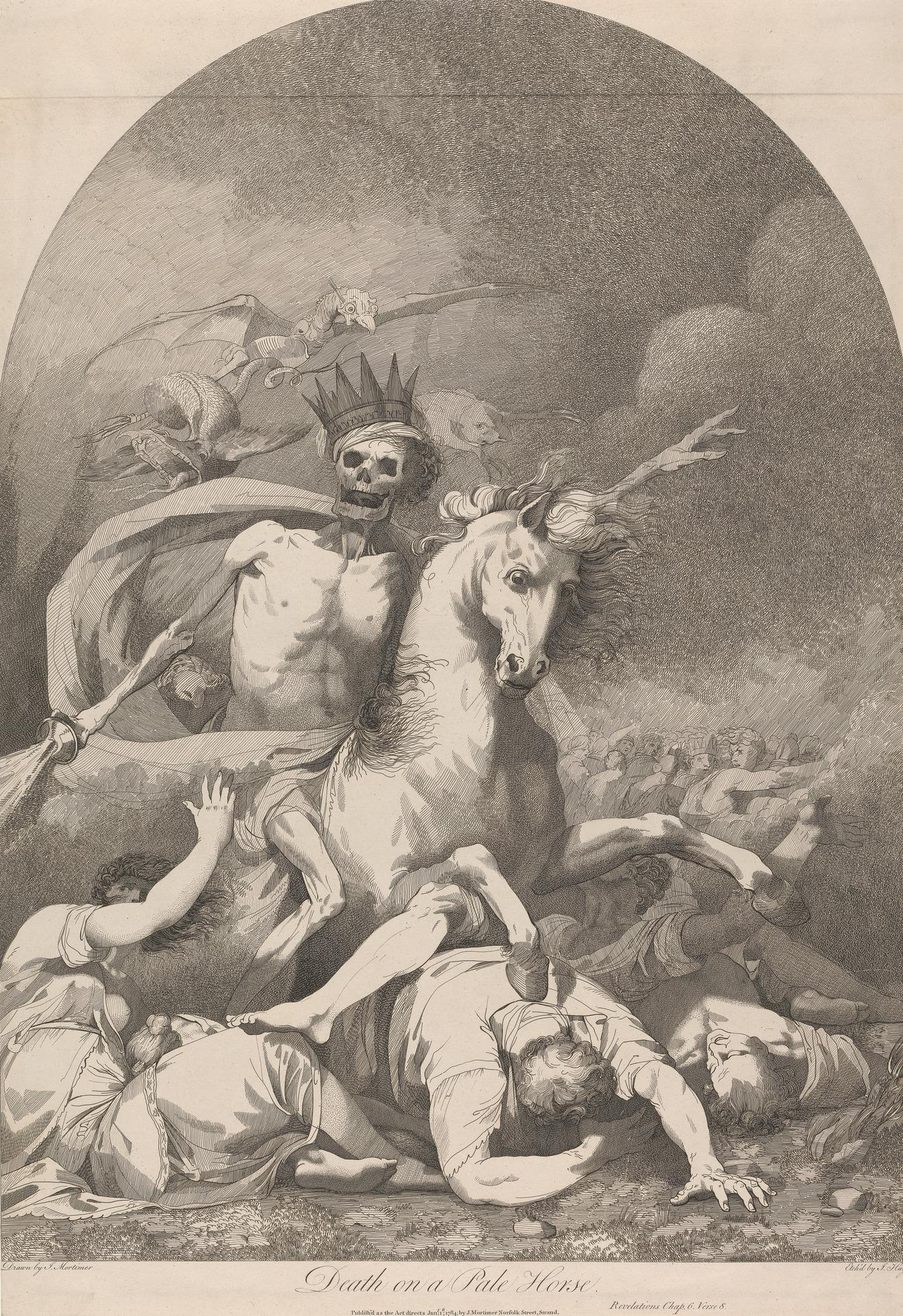
Death on a Pale Horse, 1784

Joseph Haynes (1760–1829) was an English painter and etcher.

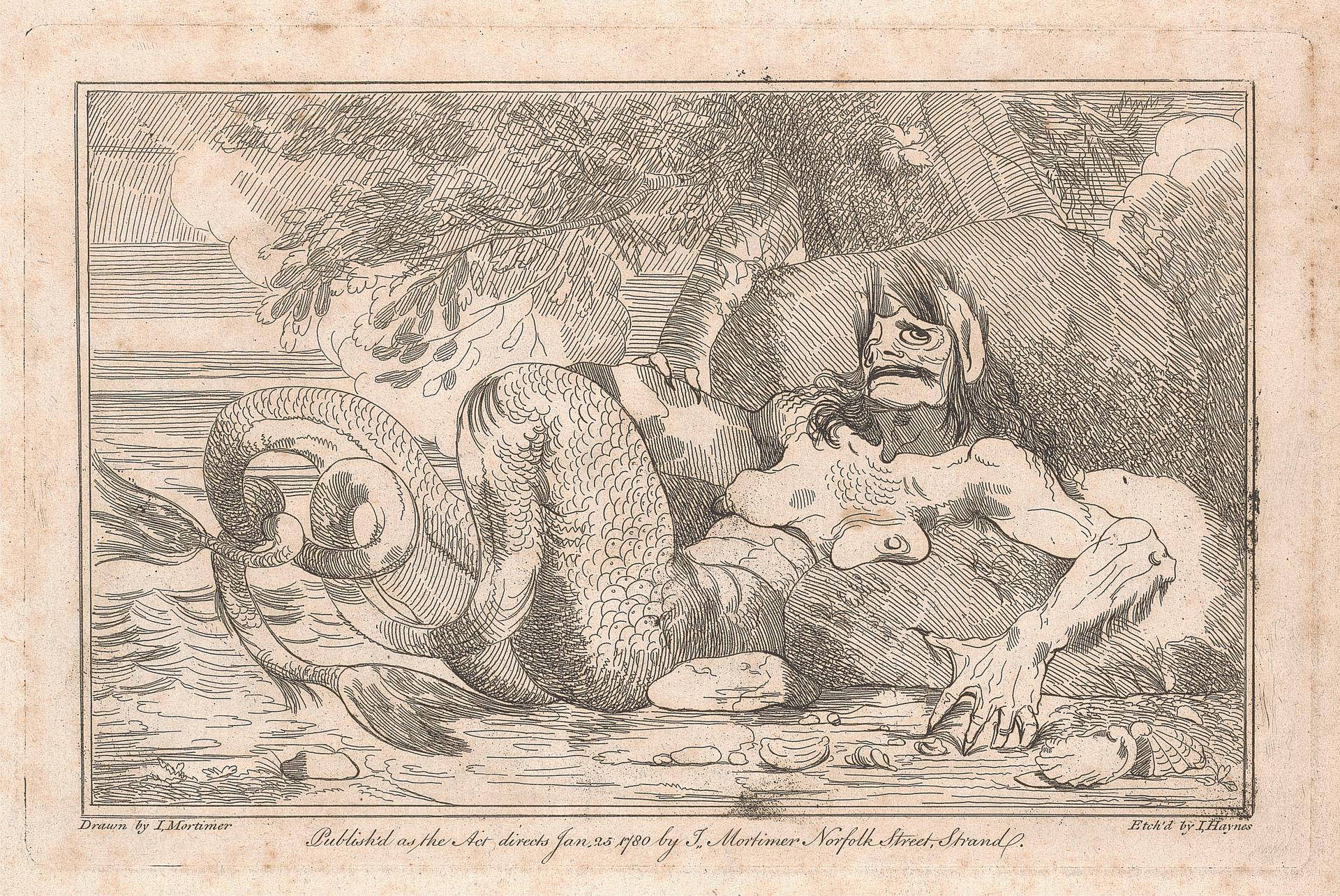
Monster (no. 5 of 10), 1750

== Life ==
Joseph Haynes was baptised at St Mary's Church, Shrewsbury, on 20 February 1761, one of several of Thomas Haynes by his wife, Margaret, née Mills, of that town.

He came to London early in life, studied under John Hamilton Mortimer, and on the death of that artist in 1779 was for some time engaged in producing etchings from about a dozen of his works, including Saint Paul Preaching to the Britons and Robbers and Banditti. These were published by Mortimer's widow between 1780 and 1784 and reissued in 1816 by Thomas Palser.

In 1784, he etched four pictures by William Hogarth: The Staymaker, Debates on Palmistry, and portraits of James Caulfeild, Earl of Charlemount, and Henry Fox, Lord Holland. In the case of the portraits, the originals were owned by the printmaker Samuel Ireland, a friend of Mortimer, who commissioned the etchings.

Haynes was also an acquaintance Sir Joshua Reynolds, and at a later date copied some of his pictures.

Haynes made a journey to Jamaica, which proved fruitless, and on his return went back to Shrewsbury. He eventually settled as a drawing-master at Chester, where he died on 14 December 1829. No wife or children are mentioned in his will, which divided his assets between a sister, a brother, and his housekeeper.

== Appraisal ==
Haynes worked in the free, graphic style of Mortimer, sometimes on an unusually grand scale for pure etching. Some of his work was printed in red as well as black. He is also stated to have worked in mezzotint.

His paintings are few, and are seldom met with, but his etchings and engravings, which in the estimation of Lionel Cust have considerable merit, are numerous.

Prints by Haynes are held by both the British Museum and the Victoria and Albert Museum.
