= Richard Haynes (cricketer) =

English cricketer

Personal information
- Full name: Richard William Haynes
- Born: 27 August 1913; Shipston-on-Stour, Warwickshire, England
- Died: 16 October 1976 (aged 63); Oxford, England
- Batting: Right-handed
- Role: Batsman

Domestic team information
- Years: Team
- 1930–1939: Gloucestershire

Career statistics
Competition	FC
Matches	74
Runs scored	1673
Batting average	14.54
100s/50s	0/2
Top score	89
Balls bowled	1566
Wickets	15
Bowling average	54.33
5 wickets in innings	0
10 wickets in match	0
Best bowling	4/76
Catches/stumpings	40/0
- Source: Cricinfo, 4 August 2013

Richard William Haynes (27 August 1913 – 16 October 1976) was an English cricketer. He played for Gloucestershire between 1930 and 1939.
