= Reynald =

Given name

Reynald is a given name. Notable people with the name include:

- Reynald de Châtillon (1125–1187), French Knight who served in the Second Crusade
- Francis Reynald Wewengkang (born 1971), current Persija Jakarta Football player
- Reynald Lemaître (born 1983), French football (soccer) midfielder
- Reynald Pedros (born 1971), former French footballer of Spanish descent

== See also ==
- Acton Reynald, village in the far North of Shropshire, England
