= Hains =

Hains is a surname. Notable people with the surname include:

- Art Hains, broadcaster
- David Hains (c. 1931–2023), businessman
- Donald Hains (1916–2005), Canadian sailor
- Mel Hains (born 1951), South African sports shooter
- Peter Conover Hains (1840–1921), military officer
- Peter Hains (1872–1955), Army captain
- Peter C. Hains III (1901–1998), military officer
- Raymond Hains (1926–2005), French visual artist
- Ted Hains (born 1948), Canadian sailor
- Thornton Jenkins Hains (1866–1953), American novelist

== See also ==
- Haines (disambiguation)
- Hains Point, park
- Hames, surname
- Hanes, clothing manufacturer
- Haynes (disambiguation)
- House Hains, historic residence in South Africa
