= Peter Hains (disambiguation) =

Peter Hains (1872–1955) was an American criminal.

Peter Hains may also refer to:

- Peter Conover Hains (1840–1921), United States Army general
- Peter C. Hains III (1901–1998), United States Army general

== See also ==
- Peter Hain, (born 1950), British politician
