= Thomas Yalden =

Thomas Yalden (2 January 1670 – 16 July 1736) was an English poet and translator. Educated at Magdalen College, Yalden entered the Church of England, in which he obtained various preferments. His poems include A Hymn to Darkness, Pindaric Odes, and translations from the classics.

== Early life and education ==
Yalden was born in 1670 in the city of Oxford, and was the sixth son of Mr. John Yalden of Sussex. Having been educated in the grammar-school belonging to Magdalen College there, he was in 1690, at the age of nineteen, admitted commoner of Magdalen Hall, under the tuition of Josiah Pullen. The next year, he became one of the scholars of Magdalen College, where he was distinguished by a lucky accident.

It was his turn one day to pronounce a declamation, and Dr. John Hough, the president, happening to attend, thought the composition too good to be the speaker's. Some time after, the doctor, finding him a little irregularly busy in the library, gave him a writing exercise for punishment, and, that he might not be deceived by any artifice, locked the door. Yalden, as it happened, had been lately reading on the subject given, and produced with little difficulty a composition, which so pleased the president that he told him his former suspicions, and promised to favour him.

Among his contemporaries in the college were Joseph Addison and Henry Sacheverell, men who were in those times friends, and who both adopted Yalden to their intimacy. Yalden continued throughout his life to think as probably he thought at first, yet did not lose the friendship of Addison.

== Career and works ==
When Namur was taken by William III of England, Yalden created an ode. There was never any reign more celebrated by the poets than that of William, who had very little regard for song himself, but happened to employ ministers who pleased themselves with the praise of patronage.

Of this ode mention is made in a humorous poem of that time, called "The Oxford Laureat", in which, after many claims had been made and rejected, Yalden is represented as demanding the laurel, and as being called to his trial instead of receiving a reward. 'His crime was for being a felon in verse, And presenting his theft to the king; The first was a trick not uncommon or scarce, But the last was an impudent thing: Yet what he had stol'n was so little worth stealing, They forgave him the damage and cost; Had he ta'en the whole ode, as he took it piece-mealing, They had fin'd him but ten pence at most.' The poet whom he was charged with robbing was William Congreve.

He wrote another poem on the death of the Duke of Gloucester.

In 1710, Yalden became fellow of the college; and next year, entering into orders, he was briefly rector of Sopworth, Wiltshire, before being presented by the society with a living in Warwickshire, consistent with his fellowship, and chosen lecturer of moral philosophy, a very honourable office.

On the accession of Queen Anne, he wrote another poem; and is said to have declared himself of the party who had the honourable distinction of Highchurchmen.

In 1706, he was received into the family of the Duke of Beaufort. Next year, he became Doctor of Divinity, and soon after resigned his fellowship and lecture; and as a token of his gratitude gave the college a picture of their founder.

He was made rector of Chalton and Cleanville, two adjoining towns and benefices in Hertfordshire, and had the prebends or sinecures of Deans, Hains, and Pendles in Devonshire. He had before been chosen, in 1698, preacher of Bridewell Hospital in London, upon the resignation of Francis Atterbury.

=== Atterbury investigation ===
From this time he seems to have led a quiet and inoffensive life, till the clamour was raised about Francis Atterbury's plot to capture the royal family. Every loyal eye was on the watch for abettors or partakers of the horrid conspiracy; and Dr. Yalden, having some acquaintance with the bishop, and being familiarly conversant with Kelly his secretary, fell under suspicion, and was taken into custody.

Upon his examination, he was charged with a dangerous correspondence with Kelly. The correspondence he acknowledged, but maintained that it had no treasonable tendency. His papers were seized; but nothing was found that could fix a crime upon him except two words in his pocket-book, 'thorough-paced doctrine'. This expression the imagination of his examiners had impregnated with treason, and the doctor was enjoined to explain them. Thus pressed, he told them that the words had lain unheeded in his pocket-book from the time of queen Anne, and that he was ashamed to give an account of them; but the truth was that he had gratified his curiosity one day by hearing Daniel Burgess in the pulpit, and those words were a memorial hint of a remarkable sentence by which he warned his congregation to 'beware of thorough-paced doctrine, that doctrine which coming in at one ear passes through the head, and goes out at the other.

Nothing worse than this appearing in his papers and no evidence arising against him, he was set at liberty.

His character prevented him from attaining high dignities in the church; but he still retained the friendship and frequented the conversation of many interesting acquaintances.

=== Hymn to Darkness ===
Of Yalden's poems, many are of that irregular kind which, when he formed his poetical character, was supposed to be Pindaric. Having fixed his attention on Abraham Cowley as a model, he has attempted in some sort to rival him, and has written a "Hymn to Darkness", evidently as a counterpart to Cowley's "Hymn to Light" ("Hymnus in Lucem").

This hymn seems to be his best performance, the third, fourth, seventh, and tenth stanzas praised the most.

There are two stanzas in this poem where Yalden may be suspected, though hardly convicted, of having consulted the "Hymnus ad Umbram" of Wowerus, in the sixth stanza, which answers in some sort to these lines:

'Illa suo praeest nocturnis numine sacris-- Perque vias errare novis dat spectra figuris, Manesque excitos medios ululare per agros Sub noctem, et questu notos complere penates.' And again at the conclusion: 'Illa suo senium secludit corpore toto Haud numerans jugi fugientia secula lapsu, Ergo ubi postremum mundi compage solut? Hanc rerum molem suprema absumpserit hora, Ipsa leves cineres nube amplectetur opac? Et prisco imperio rursus dominabitur UMBRA.'
