= USS Jenkins =

Two ships in the United States Navy have been named USS Jenkins for Rear Admiral Thornton A. Jenkins.

- The first USS Jenkins (DD-42) was a modified Paulding-class destroyer launched in 1914 and decommissioned in 1919 after service in World War I
- The second USS Jenkins (DD-447) was a Fletcher-class destroyer launched in 1942 and decommissioned by 1971
