= Peter Conover Hains =

United States Army general

Major General Peter Conover Hains
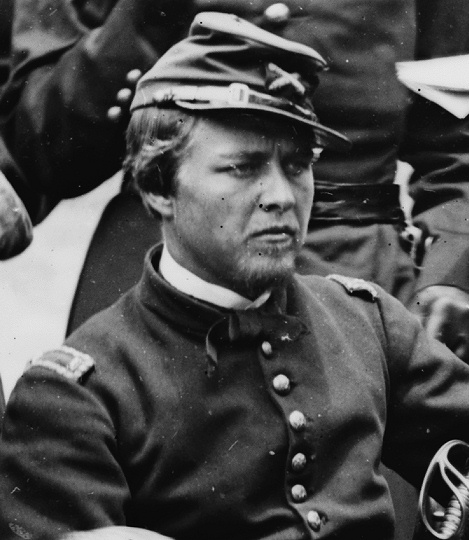
- First Lieutenant Peter C. Hains, 1862. Photo by James F. Gibson. Library of Congress.
- Born: July 6, 1840; Philadelphia, Pennsylvania, US
- Died: November 7, 1921 (aged 81); Washington, D.C., US
- Burial place: Arlington National Cemetery
- Alma mater: U.S. Military Academy
- Children: Peter Jr. and Thornton Jenkins
- Relatives: Peter C. Hains III (grandson); Thornton A. Jenkins (father-in-law)
- Military career
- Allegiance: United States of America
- Branch: United States Army; Union Army
- Service years: 1857–1904, 1917–1919
- Rank: Major General
- Units: Corps of Engineers; Corps of Topographical Engineers
- Commands: Battery M, 2nd Artillery Regiment; Engineering Regiment, XIII Corps; 5th District, U.S. Lighthouse Board; Eastern Division, USACE
- Known for: Tidal Basin, Panama Canal
- Conflicts: See battles: American Civil War; First Battle of Bull Run; Battle of Hanover Court House; Siege of Vicksburg; Spanish–American War; World War I; Atlantic theatre
- Memorials: Hains Point, East Potomac Park, Washington D.C.
- Other work: Nicaragua Canal Board; Panama Canal Commission

Peter Conover Hains (July 6, 1840 – November 7, 1921) was a major general in the United States Army, military engineer, and veteran of the American Civil War, Spanish–American War, and the First World War. He is best known for his civil engineering efforts, such as the creation of the Tidal Basin in Washington, D.C., and for laying out the Panama Canal.

== Early life and career ==
Peter Conover Hains was born in Philadelphia, Pennsylvania, to Reuben Peter Hains (1817–1873), and Amanda Hains (1821–1913). He was appointed to West Point from New Jersey, and graduated ranking 19th in the Class of June 1861. Among his classmates were Medal of Honor recipient First Lieutenant Alonzo Cushing and Major Generals George Custer, USA, and Pierce Manning Butler Young, CSA.

== Civil War ==
Hains was both commissioned as, and promoted to, a second and first lieutenant of the 2nd U.S. Artillery Regiment on June 24, 1861. Hains briefly commanded Battery M of the U.S. Horse Artillery Brigade and ordered the first shot fired by Union artillery during the Battle of Bull Run on July 21, 1861. Hains then transferred to the Corps of Topographical Engineers on July 24, 1862. He won a brevet promotion to captain on May 22, 1862, for actions at Hanover Court House. Less than a year later, on March 3, 1863, Hains transferred into the Corps of Engineers.

During the Siege of Vicksburg, Hains was cited for meritorious conduct while serving as the interim chief engineer of the XIII Corps. He was subsequently awarded a brevet promotion to major upon the capture of the city, July 4, 1863. Promoted to captain in the Engineers on July 18, he served out the remainder of the war, and received a brevet promotion to lieutenant colonel for his service during the war.

== Postbellum career ==
Major General Peter C. Hains Sr., 1910s. U.S. Army Corps of Engineers.

Hains remained with the regular army following the war, and was promoted to major in September 1870. Much of his notable post-war service was in designing lighthouses for the U.S. Lighthouse Board, where he also served as Engineering Secretary. Among other accomplishments, Hains designed the Morris Island and St. Augustine lighthouses. He was the chief engineer for the construction of Morris Island light, at the entrance of the harbor at Charleston, South Carolina, from 1872 to 1876. He became a lieutenant colonel in 1886 and was promoted to colonel in August 1895. After a flood in 1881, he designed the Tidal Basin in Washington, D.C., thus solving the drainage problems and unpleasant odor of most of the Washington area marshlands. He also designed the Potomac Park, in Washington, D.C., and the tip of East Potomac Park is named Hains Point in his honor.

Still in the Army during the Spanish–American War, Hains served as a brigadier general in the Volunteer Army from August to November 1898. He was promoted to brigadier general in the Regular Army on April 21, 1903. He successfully lobbied for the construction of the now current Panama Canal site over one proposed in Nicaragua.

Hains retired from active service in 1904, having reached the mandatory retirement age of 64.

== Later life and World War I ==
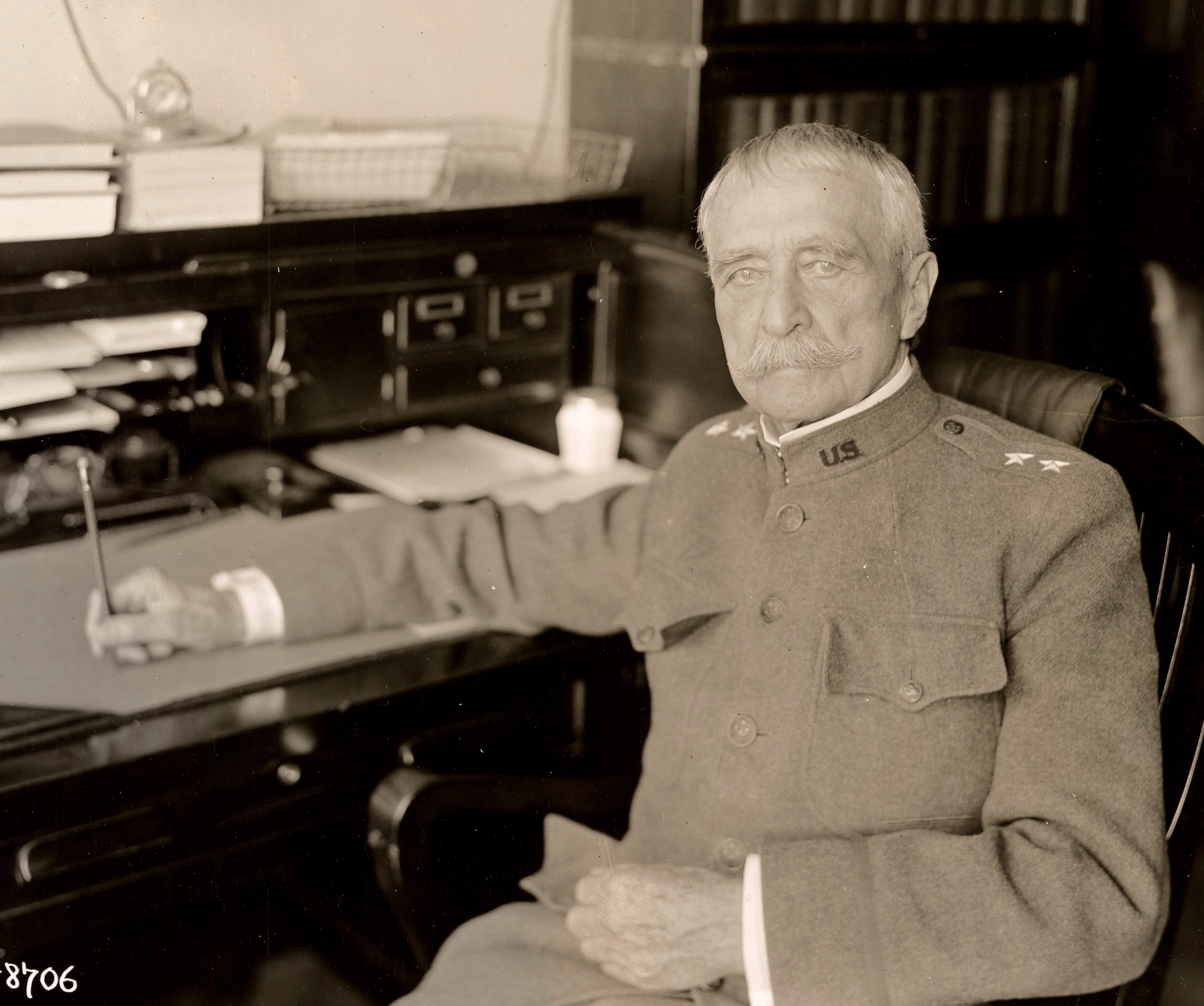
Major General Hains at his desk in April 1918

On August 15, 1908, two of his three sons, Peter C. Hains Jr. and Thornton Jenkins Hains, a well-known author of sea stories, were involved in the murder of William E. Annis at the Bayside Yacht Club, Bayside, Queens, New York City. The crime, and the subsequent separate trials for the brothers, became one of the notorious cases of its day, front-page news across the country. Thornton was acquitted in January 1909; Peter was convicted of manslaughter in May 1909 and sent to Sing Sing Prison, but, on Hains' appeal, was pardoned by John Alden Dix, Governor of New York, in 1911. Hains spent much of his savings on financing the defense of his sons.

In recognition of his long and distinguished career, Hains was promoted to major general on the retired list in 1916.

He was recalled to active duty during the First World War, in September 1917, at the age of 77. He served as the chief engineer for the Norfolk Harbor and River District and then as chief engineer for the Eastern Division of the Corps of Engineers. He left active duty in the fall of 1918.

Hains was the oldest officer to serve on active duty since Major General John E. Wool retired in 1863 at the age of 79. (The oldest active duty officer in the history of the U.S. Army was Brevet Brigadier General John Walbach who died on active duty in 1857 at the age of 90.) He was likely the only person to serve on active duty with the U.S. Military in both the American Civil War and the First World War.

General Hains died at Walter Reed General Hospital on November 7, 1921, and was buried in Arlington National Cemetery. His wife, Virginia Pettis Jenkins Hains (1840–1929), daughter of Rear Admiral Thornton A. Jenkins, was buried beside him.

He was a member of the Military Order of the Loyal Legion of the United States and the Military Order of Foreign Wars.

== Family and legacy ==
His sons, John Power Hains and Peter Hains Jr., were both army officers. His grandson and namesake, Peter C. Hains III, was also a major general in the U.S. Army and competed in the 1928 Summer Olympics. All are buried at Arlington National Cemetery. Further, his great-grandson, Col. Peter C. Hains IV, and great-great-grandson, Maj. John Power Hains II, served as Army officers while another great-great-grandson, Lt. Col. Paul Hains, served as an Army National Guard officer.

== Dates of rank ==
Insignia	Rank	Date	Component
No insignia	Cadet	July 1, 1857	United States Military Academy
	Second Lieutenant	June 24, 1861	Regular Army
	First Lieutenant	June 24, 1861	Regular Army (Union army)
	Brevet Captain	May 27, 1862	Regular Army
	Brevet Major	July 4, 1863	Regular Army
	Captain	July 18, 1863	Regular Army
	Brevet Lieutenant Colonel	March 13, 1865	Regular Army
	Major	September 22, 1870	Regular Army
	Lieutenant Colonel	September 16, 1886	Regular Army
	Colonel	August 13, 1895	Regular Army
	Brigadier General	May 27, 1898	Volunteer Army
	Brigadier General	April 21, 1903	Regular Army
	Brigadier General	July 6, 1904	Retired List
	Major General	August 20, 1916	Retired List
	Major General	September, 1917	National Army (Active duty)

== Awards and decorations ==
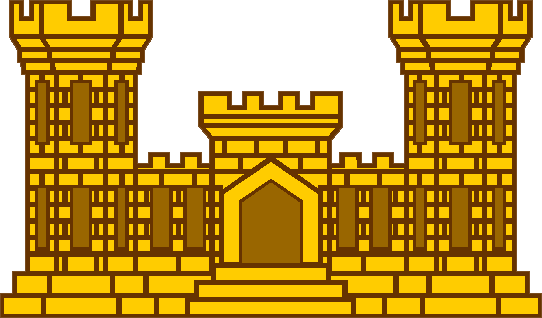

Insignia	Corps Castle		
1st Row Awards	Civil War Campaign Medal	Spanish War Service Medal	World War I Victory Medal

== See also ==
- Military engineering of the United States
- List of World War I military personnel educated at the United States Military Academy
- John Clem
