= Sopworth =

Village in Wiltshire, England

Coordinates: 51.575°N 02.2513°W

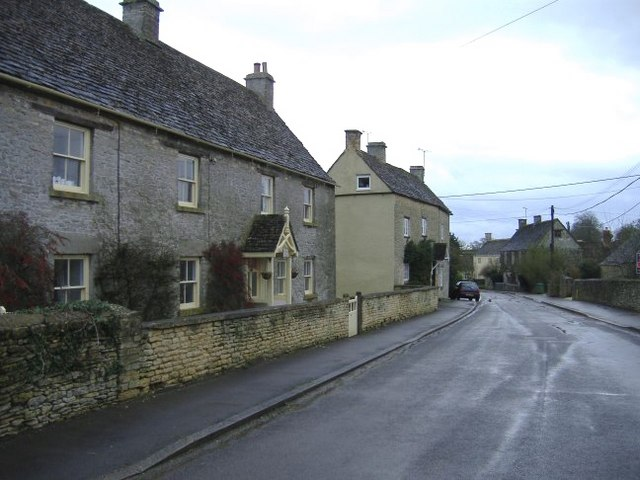

- Location within Wiltshire
- Population: 103 (in 2011)
- OS grid reference: ST827863
- Unitary authority: Wiltshire
- Ceremonial county: Wiltshire
- Region: South West
- Country: England
- Sovereign state: United Kingdom
- Post town: Chippenham
- Postcode district: SN14
- Dialling code: 01666
- Police: Wiltshire
- Fire: Dorset and Wiltshire
- Ambulance: South Western
- UK Parliament: South Cotswolds

Sopworth is a small village and civil parish in northwest Wiltshire, England, on the county's border with Gloucestershire. The village lies about 1.7 miles (2.7 km) west of Sherston and 6.5 miles (10 km) west of Malmesbury. The parish is within the Cotswolds Area of Outstanding Natural Beauty.

== Domesday entry ==
Sopworth is mentioned in the 1086 Domesday Book, its entry falling under section XXXII, The Land of William Deu. It reads:

Hugh holds Sopeword of William. Ælfric held it TRE, and it paid geld for 5 hides. There is land for 6 ploughs. Of this 3½ hides are in demesne, and there are 2 ploughs, and 6 slaves; and 3 villans and 5 bordars with 3 ploughs. It was worth £6; now £4.

== Local government ==
The civil parish does not elect a parish council; instead the first tier of local government is a parish meeting, which all electors are entitled to attend. The parish is in the area of Wiltshire Council unitary authority, which is responsible for all significant local government functions.

== Parish church ==
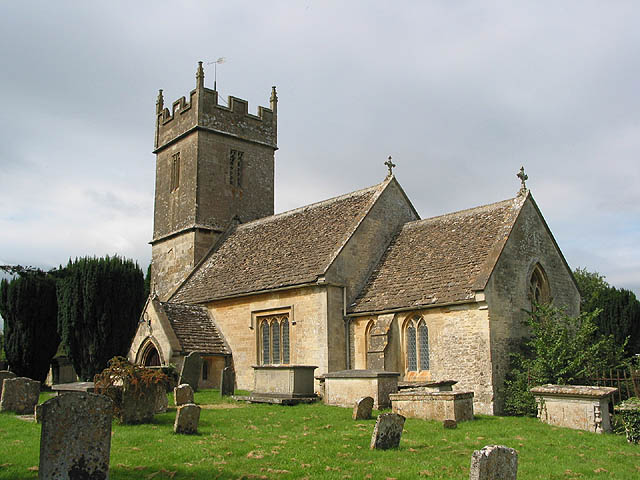
St Mary's Church

The Church of England parish church of St Mary the Virgin is Grade II* listed. Probably begun in the 13th century, it was altered and extended in the 15th century, and restored in 1871 by T.H. Wyatt. Pevsner describes the church as "drastically restored".

Built partly in dressed stone and partly in coursed rubble, the church has a chancel, nave with north aisle, south porch and 15th-century west tower. Most of the windows were renewed in the 19th century but the chancel retains a 13th-century lancet window. The chancel arch is 14th-century. The north aisle was rebuilt in the 19th century but the north transept (now the organ chamber) has older masonry.

The circular font is 13th-century. The pulpit was constructed in the 19th century using 17th-century panels. Glass in the three-light south-east window of the nave, in subdued blue and green, is by Morris & Co., c.1873; it depicts the Three Marys, the central figure by Burne-Jones and the others by Morris.

The poet Thomas Yalden (1670–1736) was briefly rector of the parish.

The parish is within the Wotton deanery of the diocese of Gloucester. The registers survive in the Wiltshire and Swindon History Centre for christenings (1697–1991), marriages (1698–1992), and burials (1697–1992). Today the church is part of the Badminton benefice, a grouping of largely Gloucestershire churches.

== Other notable buildings ==
Just south of the church, the large house formerly called Sopworth Manor is now three dwellings. Built as the rectory in the early 18th century, and called "handsome" by Julian Orbach, it has a seven-bay south front.

On the main street, the five-bay Old Manor House is from the late 17th century, altered c. 1840. Street Farmhouse is a 16th-century building while Manor and North End Farmhouses date from the 17th century. They, and several cottages in the village are all Grade II listed buildings.
