= Thornton A. Jenkins =

United States Navy admiral (1811–1893)

Thornton Alexander Jenkins
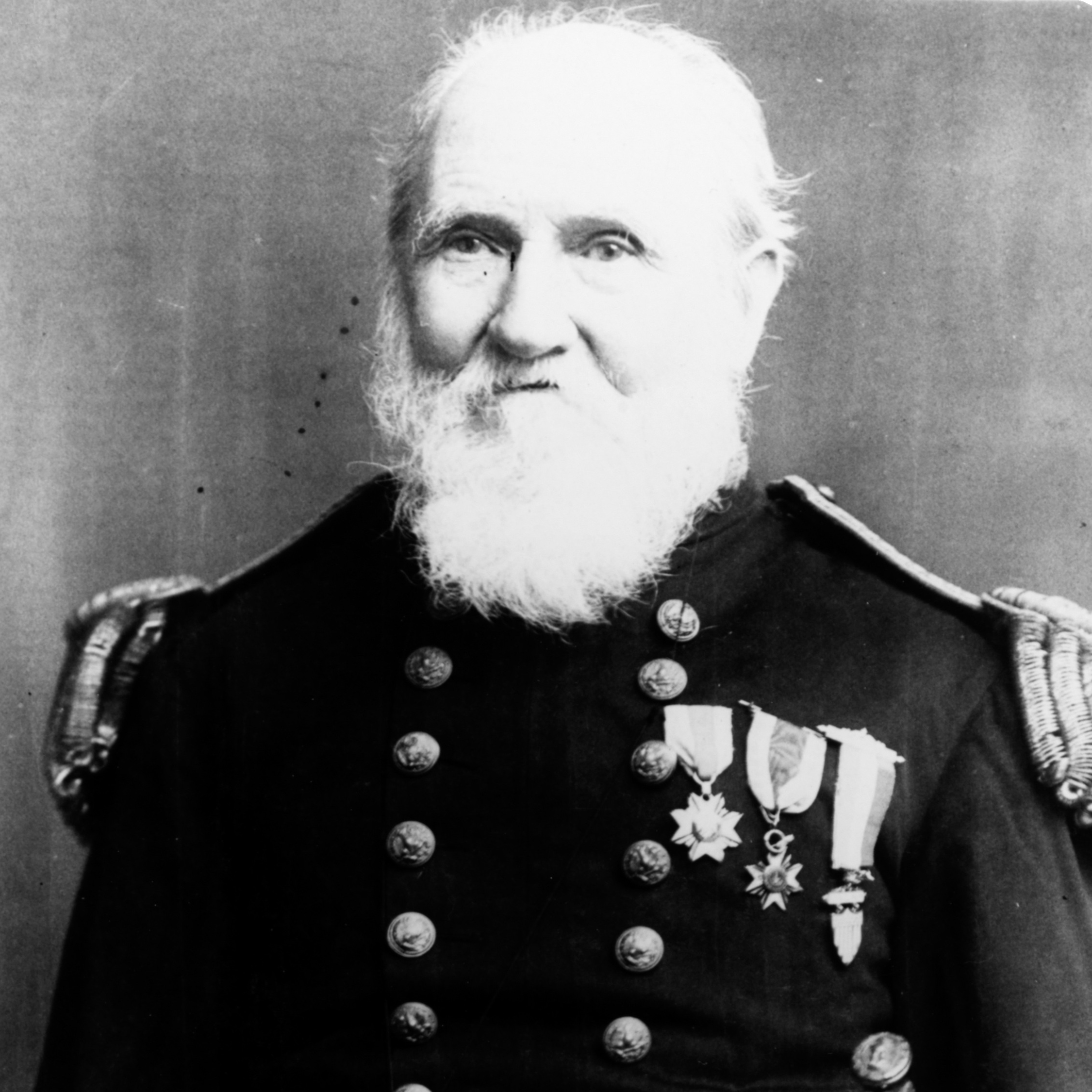
- Jenkins c. 1892
- Born: 11 December 1811; Orange Court House, Virginia, US
- Died: 9 August 1893 (aged 81); Washington, D.C., US
- Burial place: Arlington National Cemetery
- Military career
- Allegiance: United States
- Branch: United States Navy
- Service years: 1828–1873
- Rank: Rear Admiral
- Commands: Asiatic Squadron; Bureau of Navigation; Second Division, West Gulf Blockading Squadron; USS Richmond; USS Hartford; USS Oneida; USS Wachusett; USS Preble; USS Relief
- Conflicts: Mexican–American War; Paraguay Expedition; American Civil War

Thornton A. Jenkins (11 December 1811 – 9 August 1893) was an officer in the United States Navy, who served during the Mexican–American War and the American Civil War. He later served as chief of the Bureau of Navigation and as president of the United States Naval Institute. Jenkins retired as a rear admiral.

== Early life and career ==
Born at Orange Court House, Virginia, Jenkins entered the Navy as a midshipman on 1 November 1828, and served first in the West Indies in an expedition against pirates and slavers. Examined for a commission as lieutenant, he placed first among 82 candidates. In 1831 Jenkins helped to suppress Nat Turner's slave rebellion.

Prior to the Mexican–American War, Jenkins served with the United States Coast Survey and with the Brazilian and Mediterranean Squadrons. During the war with Mexico, as executive officer of Germantown, he led landing parties from his ship at Tuxpan and Tabasco. Later, he commanded the store-ship Relief and the supply station at Salmedina Island. In the interval between the wars, he served in the receiving ship at Baltimore, Maryland, returned to the U.S. Coast Survey, and was secretary of the Lighthouse Board.

Jenkins was promoted to commander on 14 September 1855. From September 1858 to October 1860, he commanded the sloop-of-war Preble on Brazil Station and in the Gulf of Mexico. His ship participated in the Paraguay expedition.

== Civil War service ==
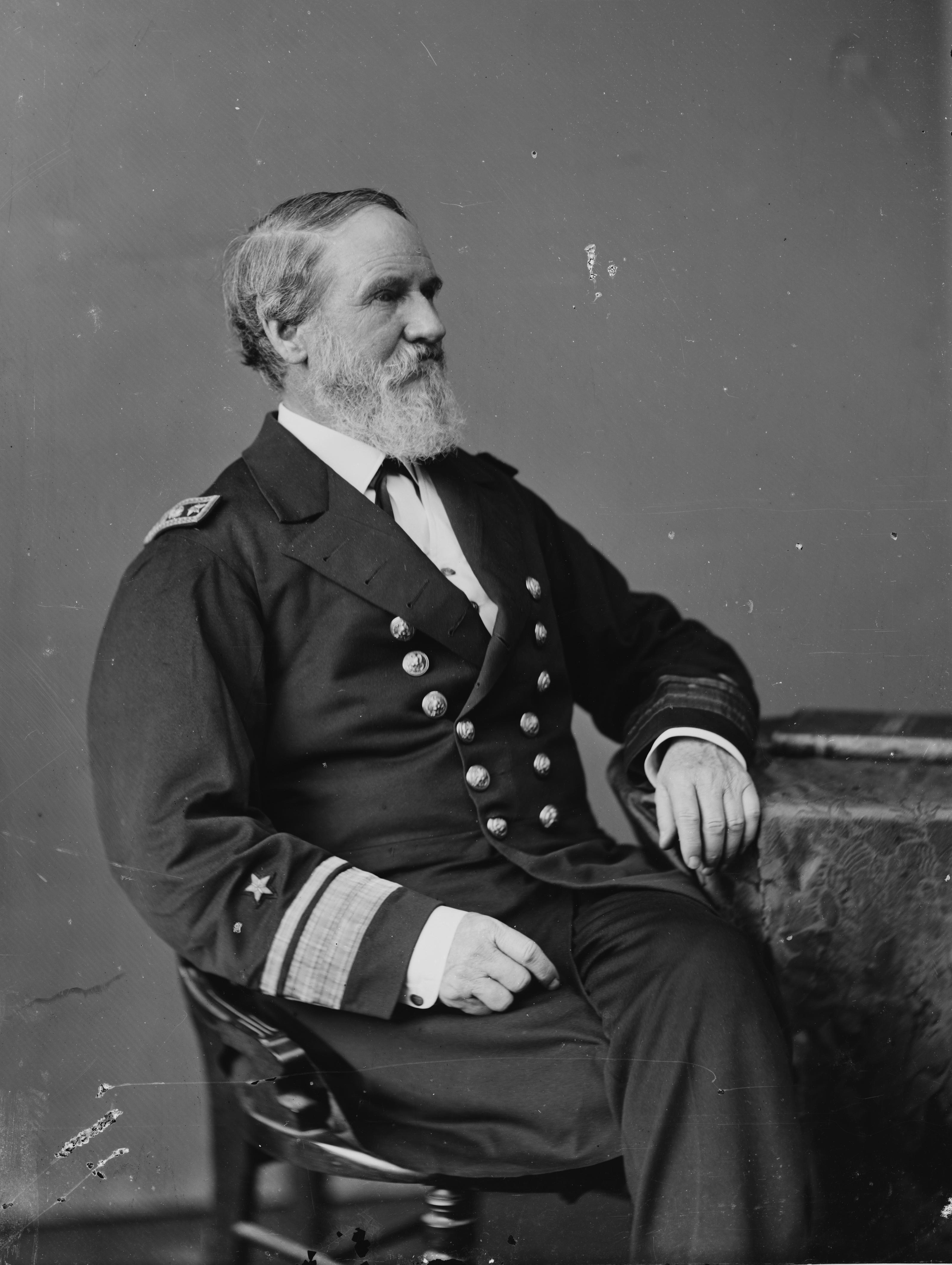

His Civil War record was distinguished. In 1861, Jenkins performed secret services for President Lincoln, until he became ill in 1861. From June to September 1862, Jenkins commanded the sloop-of-war Wachusett in the James and Potomac Rivers. He was promoted to captain on 16 July 1862.

After this, Jenkins served in the West Gulf Blockading Squadron of David Farragut until January 1865. He commanded Oneida from September 1862 to February 1863 and Hartford from February to May 1863. He served as chief of staff to Farragut, and was later wounded while commanding a convoy escort group. As senior officer present, in command of Richmond, he received the surrender of Port Hudson on 9 July 1863. Admiral Farragut had temporarily gone to New Orleans on business at the time. Jenkins later commanded a division of the squadron. He was present at the Battle of Mobile Bay and heard Farragut utter the famous line "Damn the torpedoes, full speed ahead." Though, according to Thornton, what Farragut actually said was "Go ahead sir and damn the torpedoes!"

== Postwar activities ==
Jenkins was chief of the Bureau of Navigation from August 1865 to April 1869. He was promoted to commodore on 25 July 1866 and rear admiral on 15 August 1870. Jenkins commanded the Asiatic Squadron from April 1872 until his retirement in December 1873. He was president of the Naval Institute from 1883 to 1885.

Jenkins died at his home in Washington, D.C. on 9 August 1893. He was buried at Arlington National Cemetery.

== Namesakes ==
- Two destroyers of the United States Navy have been named USS Jenkins in his honor.
- His grandson, Thornton Jenkins Hains (son of MG Peter Conover Hains), a novelist and murder suspect
- Father-in-law of Florence Foster Jenkins

Military offices
Preceded by John Rodgers	Commander, Asiatic Squadron; 1 September 1872–12 December 1873	Succeeded by Enoch Greenleafe Parrott
