= Potomac Park =

Potomac Park may refer to:

- East Potomac Park in Washington, D.C., built on an island reclaimed from the Potomac River 1881-1917
- West Potomac Park in Washington, D.C., built on land reclaimed from the Potomac River 1881-1912
- Potomac Park, California
- Potomac Park, Maryland
