= Peter Hains =

American criminal (1872–1955)

Peter Conover Hains Jr.
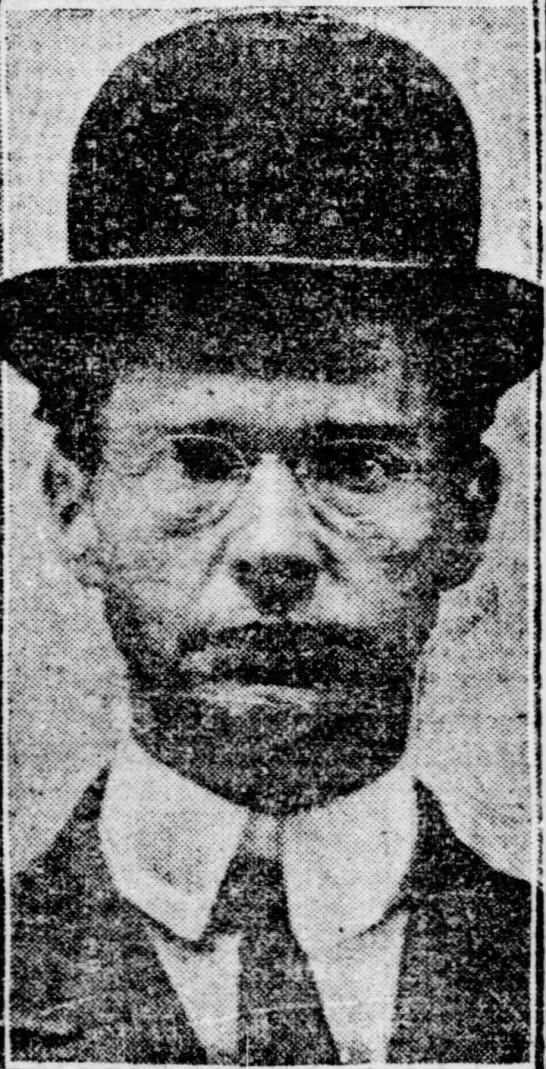
- Hains in a 1908 newspaper
- Born: January 9, 1872; Baltimore, Maryland, U.S.
- Died: February 5, 1955 (aged 83); Bokeelia, Florida, U.S.
- Children: Peter Conover Hains III
- Relatives: Peter Conover Hains Sr. (father); Thornton Jenkins Hains (brother)
- Military career
- Allegiance: United States
- Branch: United States Army
- Service years: 1898–1911
- Rank: Captain

Peter Conover Hains Jr. (January 9, 1872 – February 5, 1955) was a United States Army captain convicted of killing his wife's lover. The case became a sensational murder trial in New York City in 1908. He was the son of Major General Peter Conover Hains and the father of Peter C. Hains III.

Hains attended the United States Naval Academy from 1889 to 1893, but did not graduate. He was commissioned into the United States Army in July 1898 with the rank of second lieutenant, serving with the artillery and achieving the rank of captain in December 1902.

In 1908, abetted by his brother, the novelist Thornton Jenkins Hains, Peter Hains gunned down prominent magazine editor and Harper's contributor William Annis at a yacht club in Bayside, Queens. The crime, known as the Hains-Annis Case or the "Murder at the Regatta," played an important role in the development of criminal and matrimonial law. Peter Hains was convicted of manslaughter and received an eight-year sentence, but later received a pardon from the governor of New York. His brother pleaded temporary insanity and was acquitted of manslaughter.

The murder, committed while Hains was still an active duty Army officer, did not disqualify him from military service; after he had been convicted and incarcerated, following the passage of a Congressional act which would have allowed the dismissal of convicted service members, Hains resigned from the United States Army in 1911.

It was one of the last cases in which a defendant pleaded Dementia Americana, the psychiatric pathology that allegedly drove American men to kill the lovers of their unfaithful wives. Harry Thaw used a similar defense during his trial for the murder of architect Stanford White.

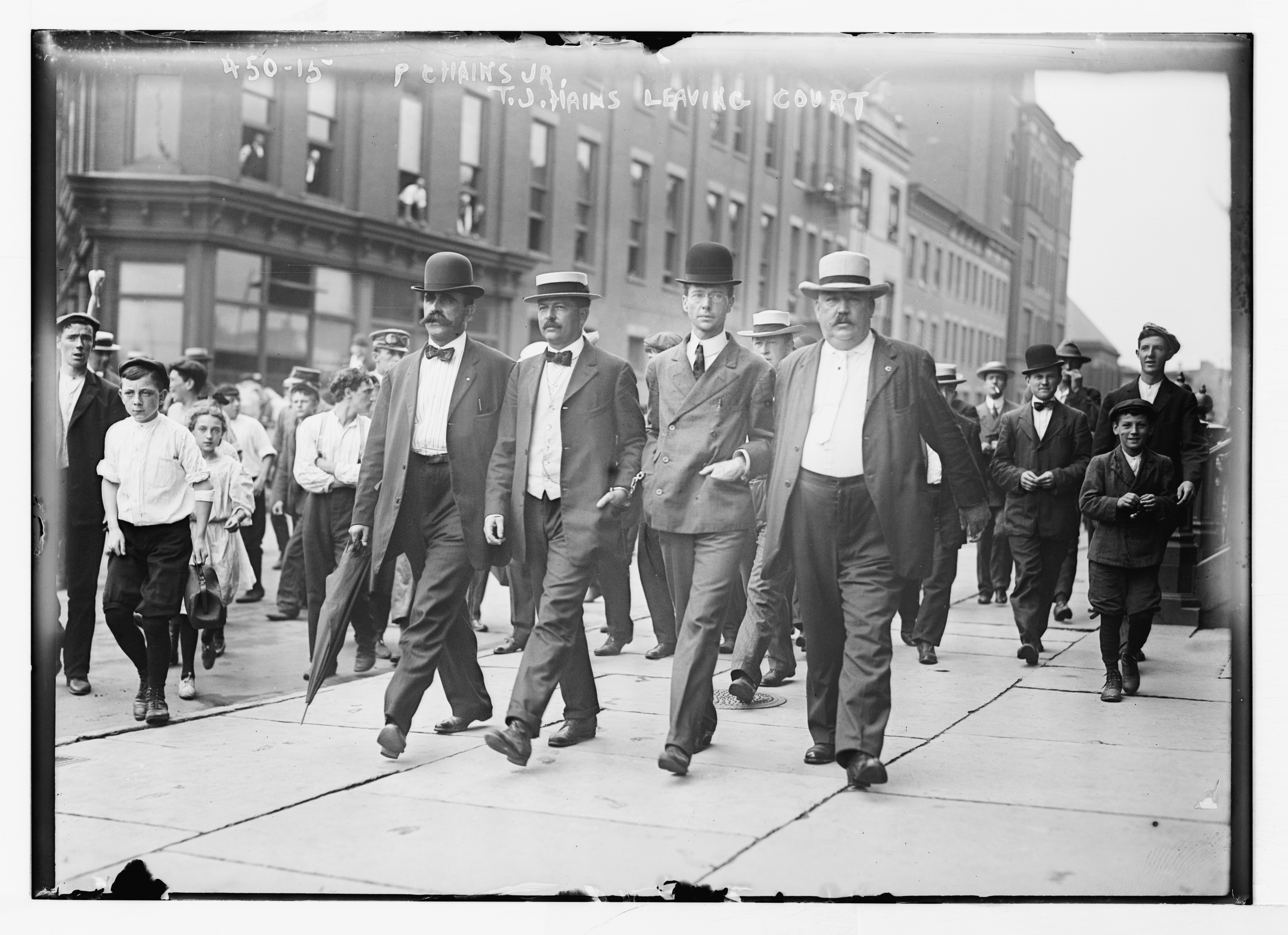
Leaving court

The trial was front-page news across the country at the time and ranks with the trials of Josephine Terranova and Richard Bruno Hauptmann as among the most widely watched and reported American criminal trials of the first half of the twentieth century.

== See also ==
- Peter Conover Hains
- Peter C. Hains III
