= Peter C. Hains III =

United States Army general (1901–1998)

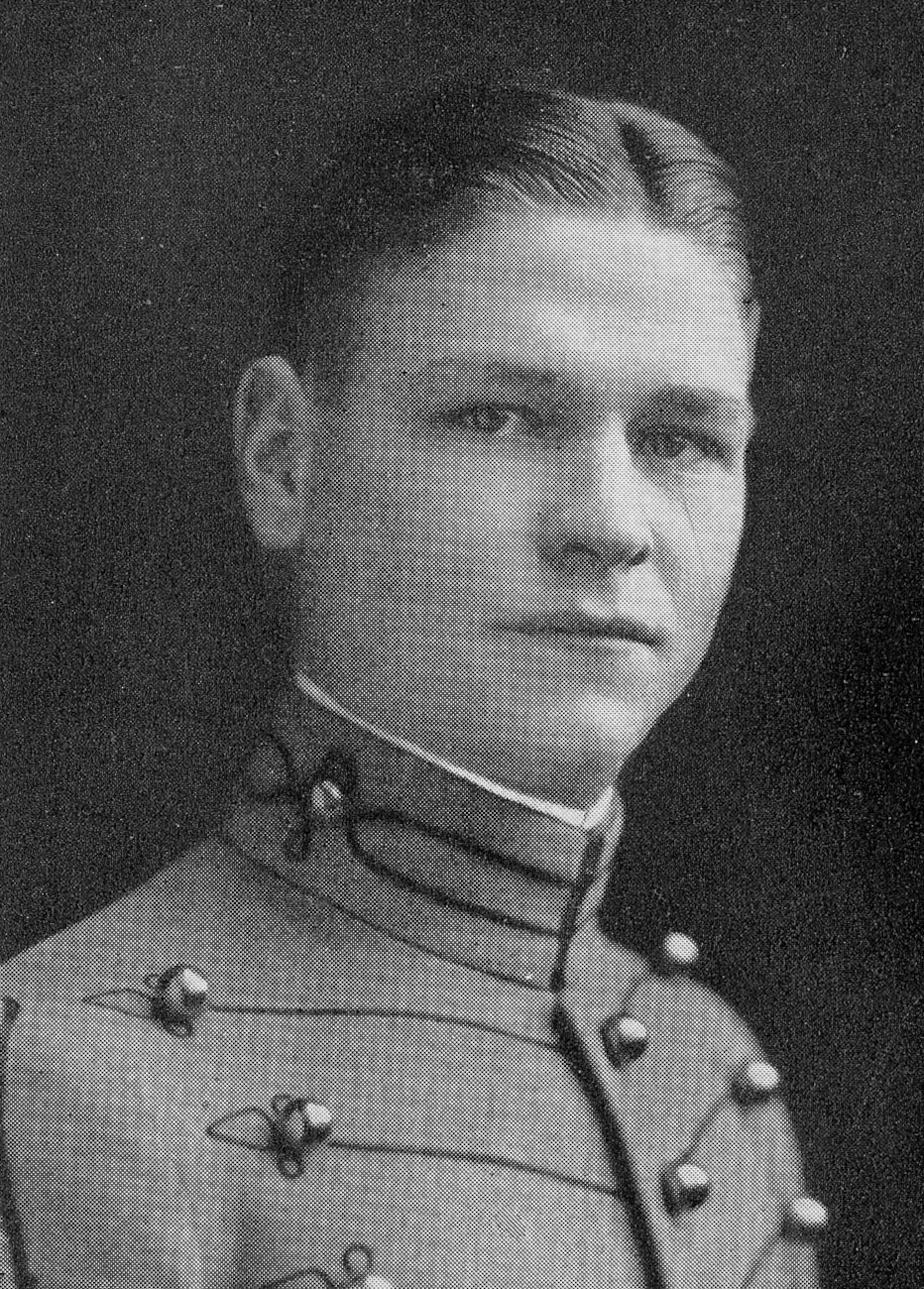
- At West Point in 1924
- Born: May 11, 1901; Winthrop, Massachusetts, U.S.
- Died: July 3, 1998 (aged 97); Fort Belvoir, Virginia, U.S.
- Burial place: Arlington National Cemetery
- Relatives: Peter Hains (father); Thornton Jenkins Hains (uncle); Peter Conover Hains (grandfather)
- Military career
- Allegiance: United States
- Branch: United States Army
- Service years: 1924–1961
- Rank: Major General
- Unit: Cavalry Branch
- Conflicts: World War II; Cold War
- Awards: Distinguished Service Medal; Silver Star; Legion of Merit; Bronze Star Medals; Army Commendation Medal; Purple Heart

Peter Conover Hains III (May 11, 1901 – July 3, 1998) was an American Army cavalry officer and major general who competed in the 1928 Olympic games in the modern pentathlon. Hains graduated from West Point in 1924, where he ranked 162nd out of 405 in his class. Peter was a member of the Hains' family, which has a long legacy of military service, with his great-grandfather, grandfather, and uncle all serving as high-ranking military officers. Hains' father Peter Hains Jr. was involved in an infamous murder scandal in New York City in 1909.

General Hains served as commander of the First Armored Regiment in North Africa during the war, later become an armor officer within General Courtney Hodges' First Army and commanding officer of the Combat Command B, 13th Armored Division between 1944–1945. He was also armored adviser for the European invasion and then was assigned to the Pacific to help plan an invasion of Japan.

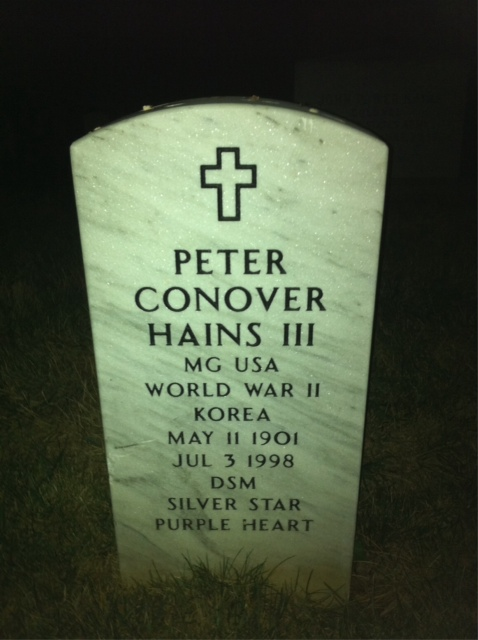
Grave at Arlington National Cemetery

After the war, he was assigned to Washington as deputy director of the office of the secretary of defense. General Hains was later deputy commanding general of the Second Army, chief of the military assistance advisory group in Yugoslavia, chief of staff of the Fourth Army and chief of the military advisory group in Thailand.

His honors included the Distinguished Service Medal, Silver Star, three Legions of Merit, two Bronze Star Medals, a Purple Heart, Army Commendation Medal, Luxembourg Order of the Oak Crown, French Legion of Honor, French Croix de Guerre with Palm and the Order of Suvorov Second Class from the Union of Soviet Socialist Republics.

He died at Fort Belvoir, Virginia on July 3, 1998, and was buried at Arlington National Cemetery.

== See also ==
- Peter Conover Hains
- Peter Hains
