= List of World War I military personnel educated at the United States Military Academy =

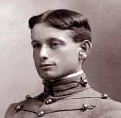
Emory Pike, class of 1901, Medal of Honor recipient, mortally wounded in World War I

The United States Military Academy (USMA) is an undergraduate college in West Point, New York that educates and commissions officers for the United States Army. This list is drawn from alumni of the Military Academy who are veterans of World War I. This includes Tasker H. Bliss (class of 1875), Hunter Liggett (class of 1879), John J. Pershing (class of 1886), Douglas MacArthur (class of 1903), "Hap" Arnold (class of 1907), George S. Patton (class of 1909), and Thomas B. Larkin (class of 1915).

== World War I veterans ==
Note: "Class year" refers to the alumni's class year, which usually is the same year they graduated. However, in times of war, classes often graduate early.

Name	Class year	Notability	References
Tasker H. Bliss	1875	General; Spanish–American War; division commander in Philippine–American War; Chief of Staff of the United States Army (1917–1918); American representative Supreme War Council	
Eli D. Hoyle	1875	Brigadier General; father of Major General Rene Edward De Russy Hoyle; grandfather-in-law of Brigadier General Willard Ames Holbrook, Jr.; son-in-law of Brigadier General René Edward De Russy	
Hugh L. Scott	1876	Major General; Indian Wars; Superintendent of the United States Military Academy; Chief of Staff; U.S. Secretary of War; the Navy vessel USS Hugh L. Scott (AP-43) was named for him	
Eben Swift	1876	Major General; Spanish–American War, Pancho Villa Expedition; commander of the 82nd Division; Director of the United States Army War College; commander of Camp Gordon; commander of U.S. Forces in Italy; father of Major General Innis P. Swift; father-in-law of Brigadier General Evan Harris Humphrey; son-in-law of Brigadier General Innis N. Palmer; Camp Swift, Texas is named for him	
Hunter Liggett	1879	Lieutenant General; Indian Wars; Spanish–American War; Philippine–American War; in 1914 predicted that an invasion of the Philippines would occur through Lingayen Gulf, which occurred twice in World War II; division and corps commander in World War I	
Benjamin Alvord, Jr.	1880	Brigadier General; Adjutant General of the American Expeditionary Force; son of Brigadier General Benjamin Alvord	
Richard W. Young	1882	Brigadier General; Philippine–American War; brigade commander; Justice of the Philippines Supreme Court; grandson of Utah Territory Governor Brigham Young	
John Wilson Ruckman	1883	Major General; inventor of artillery devices; commander of Fort Baker and Fort Mills; commander of the Southeastern Department (Aug 1917) Southern Department (Sept 1917) and the Northeastern Department (May 1918)	
Edwin Burr Babbitt	1884	Major General; Meuse-Argonne Offensive, Battle of Saint-Mihiel; recipient of the Army Distinguished Service Medal	
Robert Lee Bullard	1885	Lieutenant General; Spanish–American War; Philippine–American War; Battle of Cantigny; commander of the 1st Infantry Division; commander of the First United States Army and Second United States Army; President of the National Security League	
Willard Ames Holbrook	1885	Major General; Spanish–American War; commander of the 165th Infantry Brigade; commander of the 9th Infantry Division; Chief of the U.S. Cavalry; recipient of the Army Distinguished Service Medal; father of Brigadier General Willard Ames Holbrook, Jr.; brother of Major General Lucius Roy Holbrook; son-in-law of Major General David S. Stanley	
Mason Patrick	1886	Major General; Chief Engineer of Lines of Communication, Director of Construction and Forestry, and Chief of the Air Service of the American Expeditionary Forces; Patrick Space Force Base is named for him; the Navy vessel USS General M. M. Patrick (AP-150) was named for him	
John J. Pershing	1886	General of the Armies; Spanish–American War; Philippine–American War; Moro Rebellion; commander of 8th Regiment in the Pancho Villa Expedition; led the American Expeditionary Force in World War I	
Charles S. Farnsworth	1887	Major General; Spanish–American War, Philippine–American War; Battle of Saint-Mihiel; commander of the 37th Infantry Division; founder of Fort William McKinley; founder and commandant of the United States Army Infantry School; the Gen. Charles S. Farnsworth County Park in Altadena, California is named for him	
Robert Lee Howze	1888	Major General; American Indian Wars, Spanish–American War, Philippine–American War; Meuse-Argonne Offensive; commander of the 1st Cavalry Division; commander of the Third United States Army; commander of the 3rd Infantry Division and 38th Infantry Division; recipient of the Medal of Honor and the Army Distinguished Service Medal; father of General Hamilton H. Howze; Camp Howze and the USS General R. L. Howze (AP-134) were named for him	
Peyton C. March	1888	General; Spanish–American War, Philippine–American War, Russian Civil War; commander of 1st Artillery Brigade; Chief of Staff of the United States Army (1918–1921); father of Second Lieutenant Peyton C. March, Jr.	
Charles Symmonds	1888	Brigadier General; Spanish–American War; brigade commander; commander of Fort Bliss; recipient of the Army Distinguished Service Medal	
William G. Haan	1889	Major General; Spanish–American War, Philippine–American War; Third Battle of the Aisne, Second Battle of the Marne, Meuse-Argonne Offensive; commander of the 57th Field Artillery Brigade; the Navy vessel USS General W. G. Haan (AP-158) was named for him	
John L. Hines	1891	Major General; Spanish–American War; Philippine–American War; Pancho Villa Expedition; brigade and division commander in World War I; Chief of Staff of the United States Army (1924–1926)	
Lutz Wahl	1891	Major General; brigade commander; Adjutant General of the U.S. Army (1927–1928)	
Lucius Roy Holbrook	1896	Major General; Philippine–American War; Meuse-Argonne Offensive; commandant of the Command and General Staff College; brigade commander in the 1st Infantry Division; commander of Camp/Fort Bragg; commander of Fort Douglas and Fort Hamilton; commander of Camp Stotsenburg; commander of the 1st Infantry Division; commander of the Philippine Department	
Sherwood Cheney	1897	Brigadier General; commander, US Army Corps of Engineers; director, Army Transport Service (1919); recipient of the Army Distinguished Service Medal	
Fox Conner	1898	Major General; Chief of Operations of the American Expeditionary Force; commander of the First United States Army	
Amos Fries	1898	Major General; Philippine–American War; commander of the 1st Gas Regiment; Chief of the Chemical Warfare Service	
Guy Henry	1898	Major General; Spanish–American War, Philippine–American War, World War II; commander of the 3rd Cavalry Regiment; recipient of two Army Distinguished Service Medals and the Silver Star; son of Brigadier General, Medal of Honor recipient, and Puerto Rico Governor Guy Vernor Henry	
Manus MacCloskey	1898	Brigadier General; Spanish–American War; Battle of Verdun, Battle of Château-Thierry (1918), Battle of Belleau Wood, Battle of Soissons (1918); commander of the 12th Field Artillery Regiment; recipient of the Distinguished Service Medal and the Silver Star; father of Brigadier General Monro MacCloskey	
Stanley Dunbar Embick	1899	Lieutenant General; Spanish–American War, World War II; recipient of two Army Distinguished Service Medals; father-in-law of General Albert Coady Wedemeyer	
Clement A. Trott	1899	Major General; Chief of Staff of the 5th Infantry Division; commander of the 6th Infantry Division; recipient of the Army Distinguished Service Medal	
Ernest Dichmann Peek	1901	Major General; Supervisor of the building of Lock and Dam No. 1, Mississippi River; brigade commander; recipient of the Silver Star and the Army Distinguished Service Medal	
Clarence Sherrill	1901	Lieutenant Colonel; Led the 302d Engineers and served as chief of staff of the 29th and 77th Infantry Divisions; recipient of the Croix de Guerre and Distinguished Service Medal	
Emory Jenison Pike	1901	Lieutenant Colonel; recipient of the Medal of Honor (MOH) for actions in combat organizing and leading units during heavy shelling despite being mortally wounded; only Academy alumnus to receive the MOH during World War I	
Hugh S. Johnson	1903	Brigadier General; lawyer in Judge Advocate General's Corps; instrumental in implementing the Selective Service Act of 1917; Deputy Provost Marshal General (1971-1918); Director of the Purchase and Supply Branch of the General Staff (1918); commander of 15th Infantry Brigade; Director of the National Recovery Administration; named Time Person of the Year in 1933	
Douglas MacArthur	1903	General of the Army, Field Marshal in the Philippine Army; United States occupation of Veracruz; Second Battle of the Marne, Battle of Saint-Mihiel, Meuse-Argonne Offensive during World War I; commander of the 42nd Infantry Division; Superintendent of the United States Military Academy (1919–1922); brigade commander in the Philippine Division; commander of the Philippine Department; Chief of Staff of the United States Army (1930–1935); recipient of the Medal of Honor for actions during the Battle of Bataan, commander of the South West Pacific Area during World War II; Supreme Commander of the Allied Powers during the Occupation of Japan; Korean War; grandson of Wisconsin Governor Arthur MacArthur, Sr.; son of Lieutenant General and Medal of Honor recipient Arthur MacArthur, Jr.	
Julian Larcombe Schley	1903	Major General; Battle of Saint-Mihiel and Meuse-Argonne Offensive; Governor of the Panama Canal Zone; Chief of Engineers; recipient of the Army Distinguished Service Medal	
Henry Conger Pratt	1904	Major General; World War II; aide to William Howard Taft; commander of Brooks Field, Kelly Field, and Mitchel Field; Commandant of the Air Corps Tactical School; commander of the Philippine Division; commander of Fort William McKinley; commander of the Southern Defense Command and Western Defense Command; recipient of the Army Distinguished Service Medal	
Joseph Stilwell	1904	General; described Academy hazing as "hell"; U.S. Fourth Corps intelligence officer and helped plan the St. Mihiel offensive during World War I; commander of American forces in the China Burma India Theater in World War II	
Frank Maxwell Andrews	1906	Lieutenant General; commanded airfields in America during World War I, staff of Army of Occupation in Germany after the war; commander of the 1st Pursuit Group; commander of the General Headquarters Air Force and Panama Canal Air Force; commander of the Caribbean Defense Command; commander of the U.S. Army Forces in the Middle East; commander of U.S. forces of the European Theater of Operations; Joint Base Andrews Naval Air Facility, Andrews Air Force Base, and RAF Andrews Field are named for him	
Jonathan Mayhew Wainwright IV	1906	General; World War II; Battle of Saint-Mihiel, Meuse-Argonne Offensive; commander of the 3rd Cavalry Regiment and 1st Cavalry Regiment; commander of the Philippine Department; commander of the Fifth United States Army; recipient of the Medal of Honor, the Distinguished Service Cross, and the Army Distinguished Service Medal; Fort Wainwright is named for him	
Henry H. "Hap" Arnold	1907	General of the Army, General of the Air Force; second rated pilot in the United States Army Air Corps; executive officer of the aviation section at Army headquarters in Washington D.C. during World War I; World War II; commander of the United States Army Command and General Staff College; commander of March Field; commander of the United States Army Air Forces; founder of the RAND Corporation; Arnold Air Force Base, Arnold Engineering Development Center, and Arnold Air Society are named for him	
Robert L. Eichelberger	1909	General; Siberian Intervention; World War II; Superintendent of the United States Military Academy; commander of the I Corps; commander of the Eighth United States Army; recipient of two Distinguished Service Crosses, four Army Distinguished Service Medals, and the Navy Distinguished Service Medal	
George S. Patton	1909	General; 1912 Summer Olympics, modern pentathlon, 5th place; Pancho Villa Expedition; World War II; Battle of Saint-Mihiel, Meuse-Argonne Offensive; commander of the 1st Tank Brigade/304th Tank Brigade; commander of the 3rd Cavalry Regiment; commander of the 2nd Armored Division; commander of the II Corps; commander of the Seventh United States Army, Third United States Army, and Fifteenth United States Army during World War II; descendant of Brigadier General Hugh Mercer; father of Major General George Patton IV; Patton series of tanks were named for him	
Oscar Griswold	1910	Lieutenant General; World War II; Meuse-Argonne Offensive; commander of the 29th Infantry Regiment and 4th Infantry Regiment; commander of the XIV Corps; commander of the Seventh United States Army and the Third United States Army; recipient of two Army Distinguished Service Medals, Navy Distinguished Service Medal, and two Silver Stars	
Stephen J. Chamberlin	1912	Lieutenant General; World War II; commander of the Fifth Army; recipient of the Navy Cross, the Army Distinguished Service Medal, and the Silver Star	
Walton Walker	1912	General; World War I, Korean War; commander of the 3rd Armored Division; commander of the XX Corps; commander of the Fifth United States Army and Eighth United States Army; recipient of two Distinguished Service Crosses, two Army Distinguished Service Medals, and three Silver Stars; father of General Sam S. Walker	
Carl Andrew Spaatz	1914	General; Pancho Villa Expedition; flight instructor and fighter pilot in World War I; Eighth Air Force commander in World War II; first Chief of Staff of the United States Air Force (1947–1948)	
Omar Bradley	1915	General of the Army; stationed in America during World War I; commander of the 82nd Infantry Division and 28th Infantry Division in non-combat areas prior to being assigned to combat in Operation Torch, Normandy Landings, Operation Cobra, Battle of the Bulge, commander of the First United States Army, commander of the Twelfth United States Army Group; Korean War; first Chairman of the Joint Chiefs of Staff; Administrator of the Veterans Administration; Chairman of the NATO Military Committee; Bradley Fighting Vehicle named for him	
Dwight D. Eisenhower	1915	General of the Army; trained tank crews in Pennsylvania during World War I; World War II; commander of European Theater of Operations and Supreme Headquarters Allied Expeditionary Force (1942–1945); 1st Military Governor of American Occupation Zone in Germany (1945); President of Columbia University (1948–1950, 1952–1953); 1st Supreme Allied Commander Europe (1951–1952); 34th President of the United States (1953–1961)	
Luis R. Esteves	1915	Major General; first Hispanic graduate of the Academy; Pancho Villa Expedition; mayor and judge of Polvo, Mexico; commander of the 23rd Battalion, which was composed of Puerto Ricans and stationed in Panama during World War I; commander of 92nd Infantry Brigade Combat Team during World War II; founder of the Puerto Rico National Guard	
Thomas B. Larkin	1915	Lieutenant General; reconnaissance officer during Second Battle of the Marne; Tunisian campaign in World War II; Quartermaster General (1946–1949)	
Dwight Johns	1916	Brigadier General; Pancho Villa Expedition, World War II; recipient of the Army Distinguished Service Medal	
Hugh John Casey	1918	Major General; instructor and engineer company commander during World War I; Chief Engineer for General of the Army Douglas MacArthur for the South West Pacific theatre of World War II; initial designer of The Pentagon; father of Major Hugh Boyd Casey; father-in-law of Major General Frank Butner Clay	
William M. Miley	1918	Major General; World War II; commander of the 503rd Parachute Infantry Regiment; commander of the 17th Airborne Division and 11th Airborne Division; recipient of the Silver Star and two Army Distinguished Service Medals	

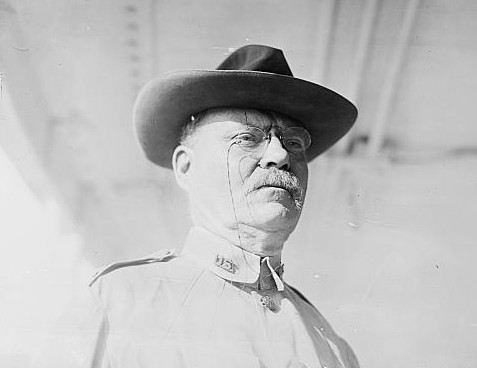
Tasker Bliss (1875)

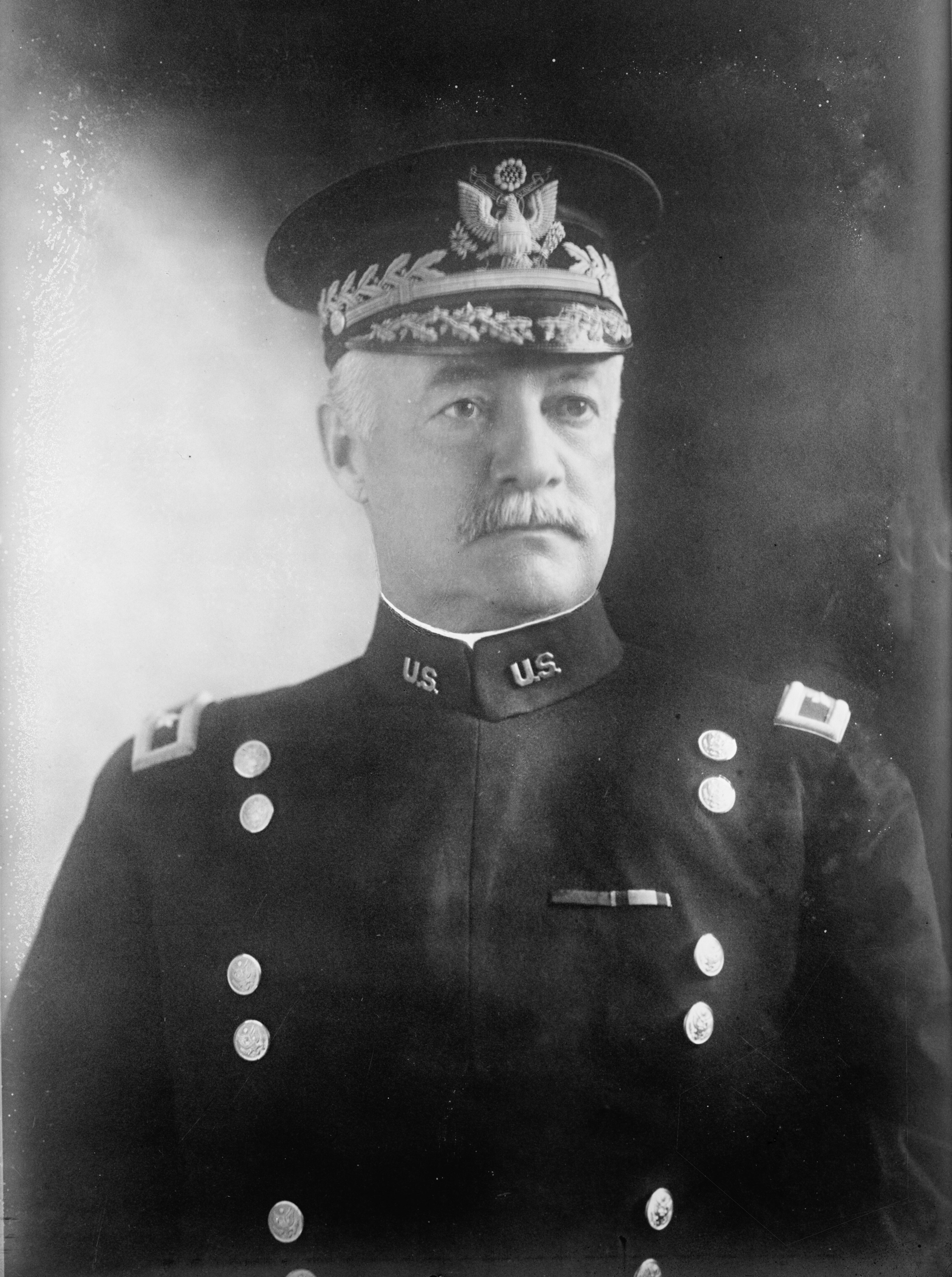
Hunter Liggett (1879)

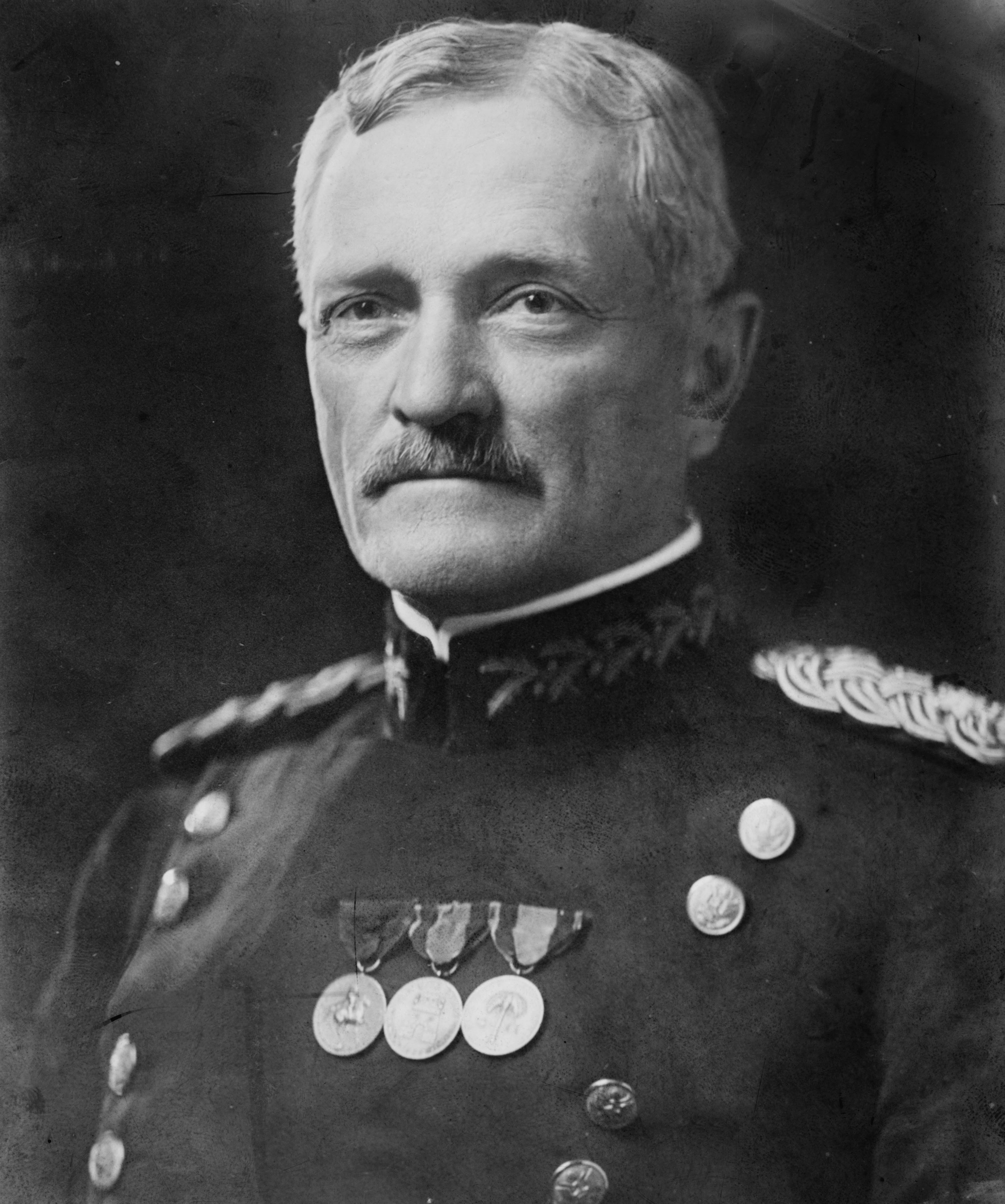
John Pershing (1886)

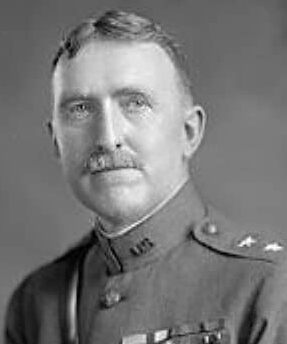
John Hines (1891)

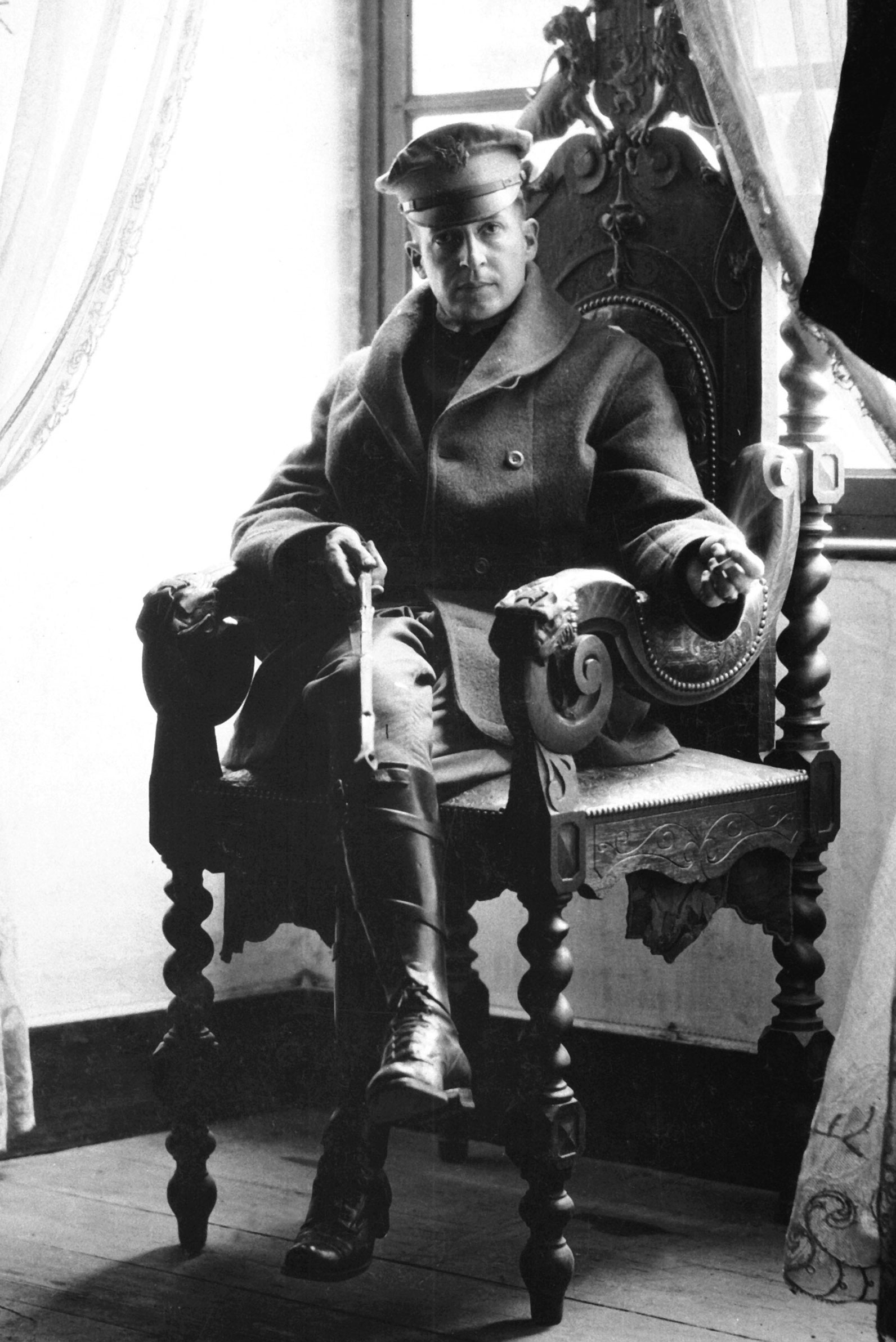
Douglas MacArthur (1903)

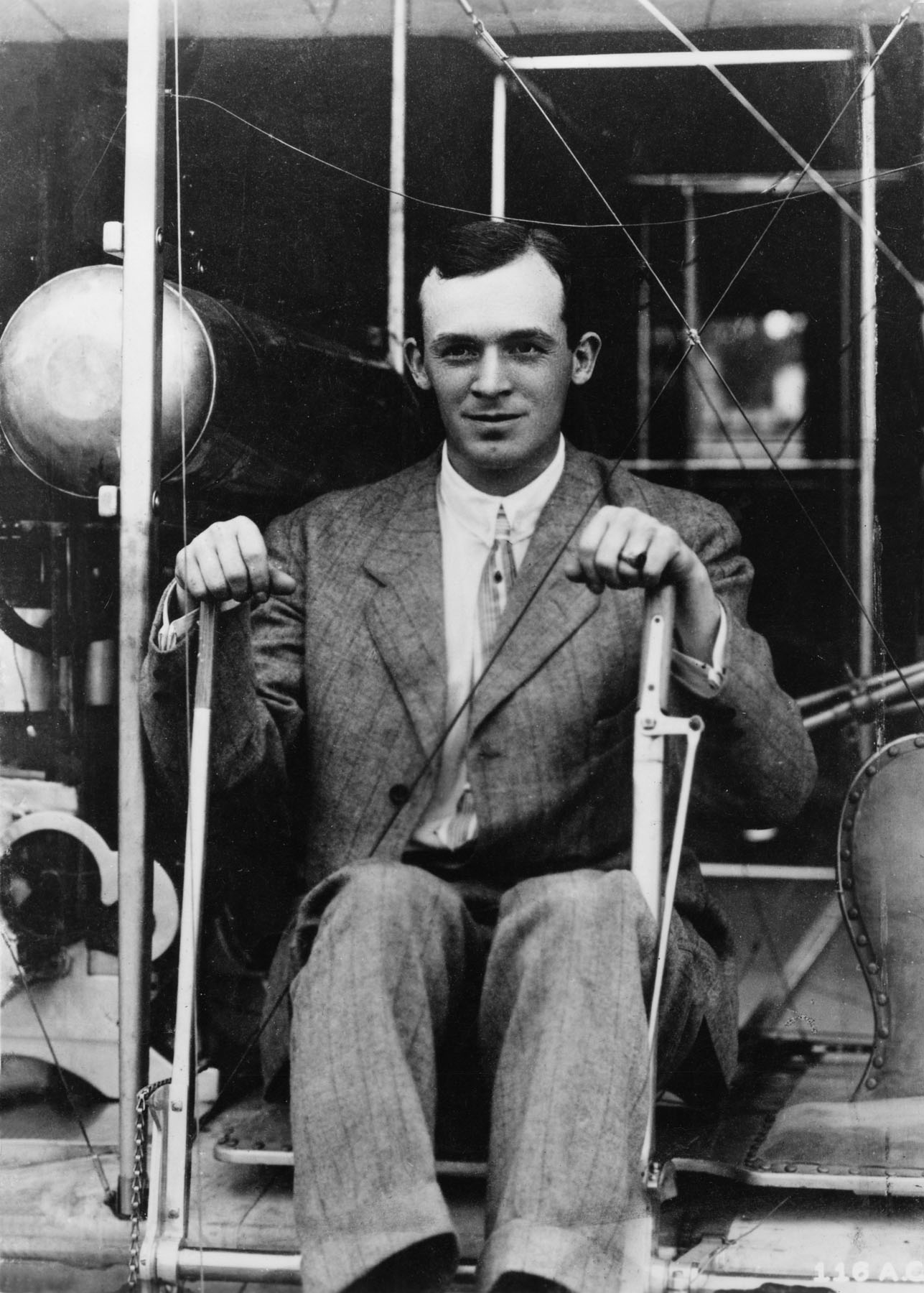
Hap Arnold (1907)

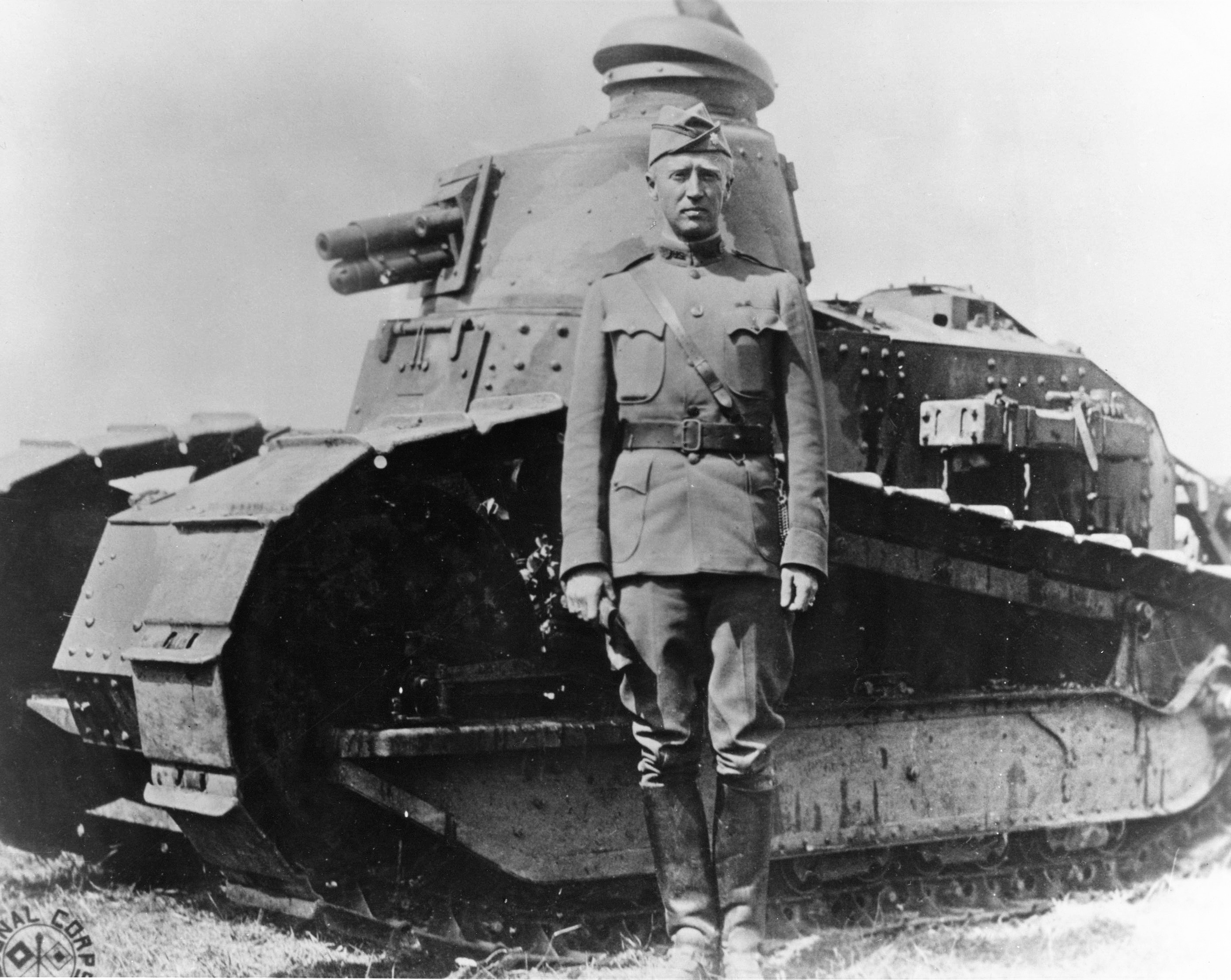
George S. Patton (1909)

Thomas Larkin (1915)
