= Thornton Jenkins Hains =

American novelist (1866–1953)

T. Jenkins Hains
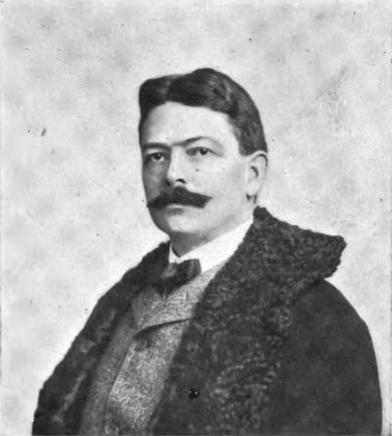
- Hains in a 1900 publication
- Born: 14 November 1866; Washington, D.C., U.S.
- Died: 19 August 1953 (aged 86); Cradock, Virginia, U.S.
- Education: nominal (at the age of 12 he took to the sea as a cabin boy on the schooner Pharos)
- Occupation: Writer
- Relatives: Thornton A. Jenkins (grandfather); Peter C. Hains Sr. (father); Peter C. Hains Jr. (brother); Florence Foster Jenkins (aunt)
- Writing career
- Pen name: Mayn Clew Garnett
- Genres: sea stories (novels and short stories)
- Notable works: The White Ghost of Disaster, The Cruise of the Petrel

Thornton Jenkins Hains (1866–1953) was an American sea novelist best known today for his role in the murder of William Annis. Hains later used the pen name Mayn Clew Garnett.

Hains' father was General Peter Conover Hains, a prestigious engineering officer who participated in the draining of the Washington Tidal Basin and the construction of the Panama Canal. Hains' maternal grandfather, Admiral Thornton A. Jenkins, served in the War of 1812. The Admiral's logbooks served as the inspiration for Hains' novel, The Cruise of the Petrel (1901).

The Hains-Annis Case, or the "Regatta Murder", concerned the killing of William Annis by Hains' brother, Peter C. Hains, in Bayside, Queens on August 15, 1908. Peter Hains was a friend of Annis, who was advertising manager for The Burr McIntosh Monthly. T.J. Hains informed Peter that Peter's wife was having an affair with Annis, and he later accompanied Peter to the victim's yacht club on the afternoon of the ladies' regatta. As Annis finished a race he had won, Peter emptied a pistol magazine of eight shots into Annis' body, in front of Annis' wife and two sons, while T.J. stood guard, his own pistol drawn. The defense of the Hains brothers was funded by their father. T.J. was tried as an accomplice (December 1908 to January 1909), pleaded temporary insanity, and acquitted of manslaughter, but the case tarnished his reputation. (Peter was tried in April–May 1909 and convicted of manslaughter. He was pardoned by the governor of New York in 1911.)

The crime played an important role in the development of criminal and matrimonial law. The case became front-page news across the nation at the time and ranks with the trials of Josephine Terranova, Harry Kendall Thaw, and Richard Bruno Hauptmann as among the most widely watched and reported American criminal trials of the first half of the twentieth century.

Hains published twelve books under his own name from 1894 to 1908. "The White Ghost of Disaster" was published in a collection under the name Captain Mayn Clew Garnett in 1912. Hains was a frequent contributor to the 1920s pulp magazine Sea Stories, primarily under his real name, but also under Garnett. His writing career seems to end about 1930.

After the trials, Hains' work no longer appeared in the higher-class magazines, and he wrote under the pen name "Mayn Clew Garnett". He achieved pseudonymous fame when his short story "The White Ghost of Disaster" (The Popular Magazine, May 1, 1912), about an ocean liner that strikes an iceberg in the Atlantic and sinks, was on the newsstands when the RMS Titanic sank. Many people attributed to him the gift of foresight, while being unaware of his true identity.

His uncle Frank Thornton Jenkins was the husband of Florence Foster Jenkins.

Thornton Jenkins Hains died August 19, 1953.
