= Josephine Terranova =

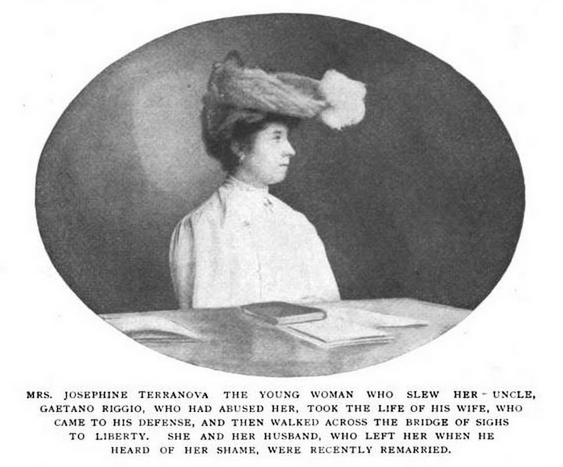
Josephine Terranova, from a 1907 publication.

Josephine Pullare Terranova (April 21, 1889, in San Stefano, Sicily, Italy – July 16, 1981, in Marin County, California) was the defendant in a sensational murder trial in New York City in 1906. After years of alleged sexual abuse at the hands of her aunt and uncle, the 17-year-old Terranova stabbed the pair to death. A jury acquitted her in what was widely regarded as an act of jury nullification.

She later settled in the San Francisco Bay Area, allegedly with the financial assistance of William Randolph Hearst. She died in Marin County, California in 1981, aged 92.

The case was a major national news story at the time, leading to a widespread public debate on the proper role of psychiatric expertise in judicial proceedings.
