= East Potomac Park =

Park in the Potomac River, Washington, D.C., U.S.

- U.S. Historic district – Contributing property
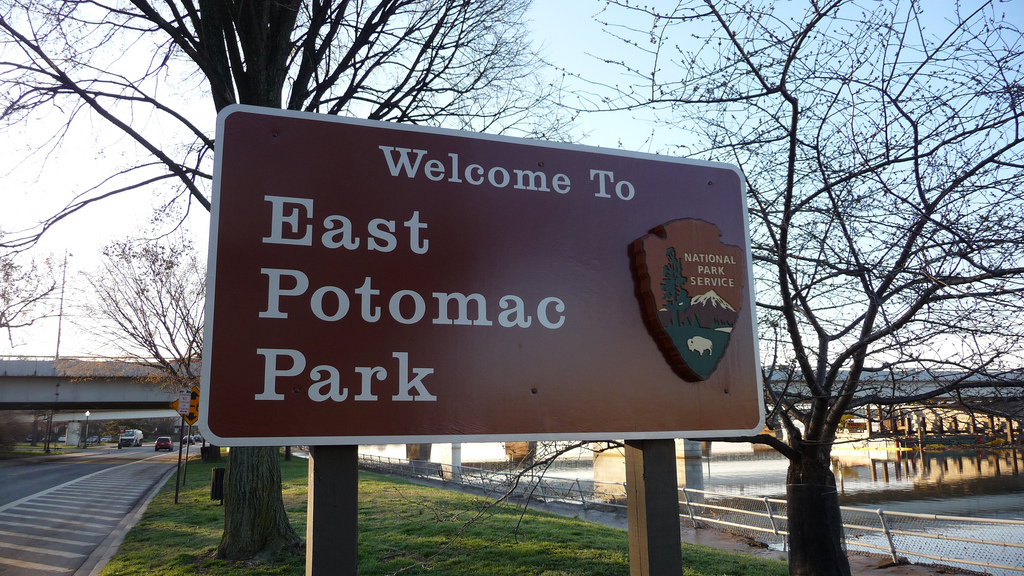

- Location within Washington, D.C.
- Location: 14th Street, Washington Channel, Potomac River, SW Washington, D.C.
- Coordinates: 38°52′3″N 77°1′30″W
- Area: 394.9 acres (159.8 ha)
- Built: 1917
- Part of: East and West Potomac Parks Historic District (ID73000217)
- Designated CP: November 30, 1973

East Potomac Park is a park located on a man-made island in the Potomac River in Washington, D.C., United States. The island is between the Washington Channel and the Potomac River, and on it the park lies southeast of the Jefferson Memorial and the 14th Street Bridge. Amenities in East Potomac Park include the East Potomac Park Golf Course, a miniature golf course, a public swimming pool (the East Potomac Park Aquatic Center), tennis courts, and several athletic fields (some configured for baseball and softball, others for soccer, rugby, or football). The park is a popular spot for fishing, and cyclists, walkers, inline skaters, and runners heavily use the park's roads and paths. A portion of Ohio Drive SW runs along the perimeter of the park. The southern tip is called Hains Point.

== Geography ==
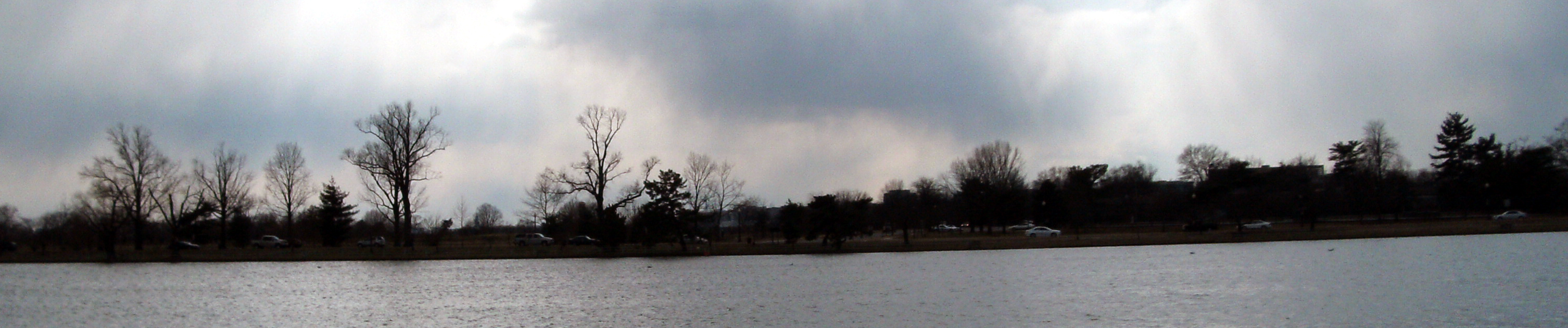
Hains Point as seen from across the Washington channel, at the Southwest Waterfront

The park covers most of the island that lies between the Washington Channel and the Potomac River, and its southern end, Hains Point, is at the confluence of the Potomac and Anacostia rivers. The point faces Fort Lesley McNair and the National War College, both of which are on the eastern shore of the Washington Channel, and Bolling Air Force Base, across the Anacostia River. The Jefferson Memorial is on the northwestern end of the island and is in West Potomac Park. To the southwest, across the Potomac in Virginia, is Ronald Reagan Washington National Airport.

The terrain of East Potomac Park is flat, rising to only about 10 feet (3.0 m).

== Facilities ==
East Potomac Park is within the jurisdiction of the National Mall and Memorial Parks unit of the National Park Service (NPS). The 330-acre (1.3 km^{2}) park contains the East Potomac Golf Club and East Potomac Swimming Pool, along with a number of Washington's famous cherry trees; these trees extend to Hains Point.

The perimeter of East Potomac Park is lined with a concrete walking/bike path. The Potomac and Anacostia Rivers often overflow their banks during high tide, covering the path with water.

A straight and generally flat stretch of Ohio Drive extends in a loop along the perimeter of East Potomac Park, including Hains Point. This road is one way within the park; traffic must travel clockwise, going generally northwest on the Potomac River side of the peninsula, and generally southeast on the Washington Channel side. Various cultivars of cherry tree line both sides of the road. Another road, Buckeye Drive, bisects the peninsula and connects the north and south portions of Ohio Drive within the park. Ohio Drive extends beyond the park and follows the Potomac as far as the Lincoln Memorial.

East Potomac Park is accessible primarily by road via Ohio Drive SW. Metrobus does not serve the park, and there is no Washington Metro stop close to the park. The nearest Metro stop is the Smithsonian station at Independence Avenue SW and 12th Street SW, about six blocks away. (Walking from Metro requires accessing the park via Raoul Wallenberg Place SW, Maine Avenue SW, and Ohio Drive SW.)

As of June 2010, East Potomac Park contains 320 parking spaces, which are accessible from both Ohio Drive and Buckeye Drive. Traffic is prohibited on weekends and some holidays on the sections of Ohio Drive between Buckeye Drive and Hains Point. This stretch of road, estimated by some as 3.2 miles (5.2 km) long (including Buckeye Drive), is a favorite of the local bicycling and inline skating community.

== History ==
=== Construction ===
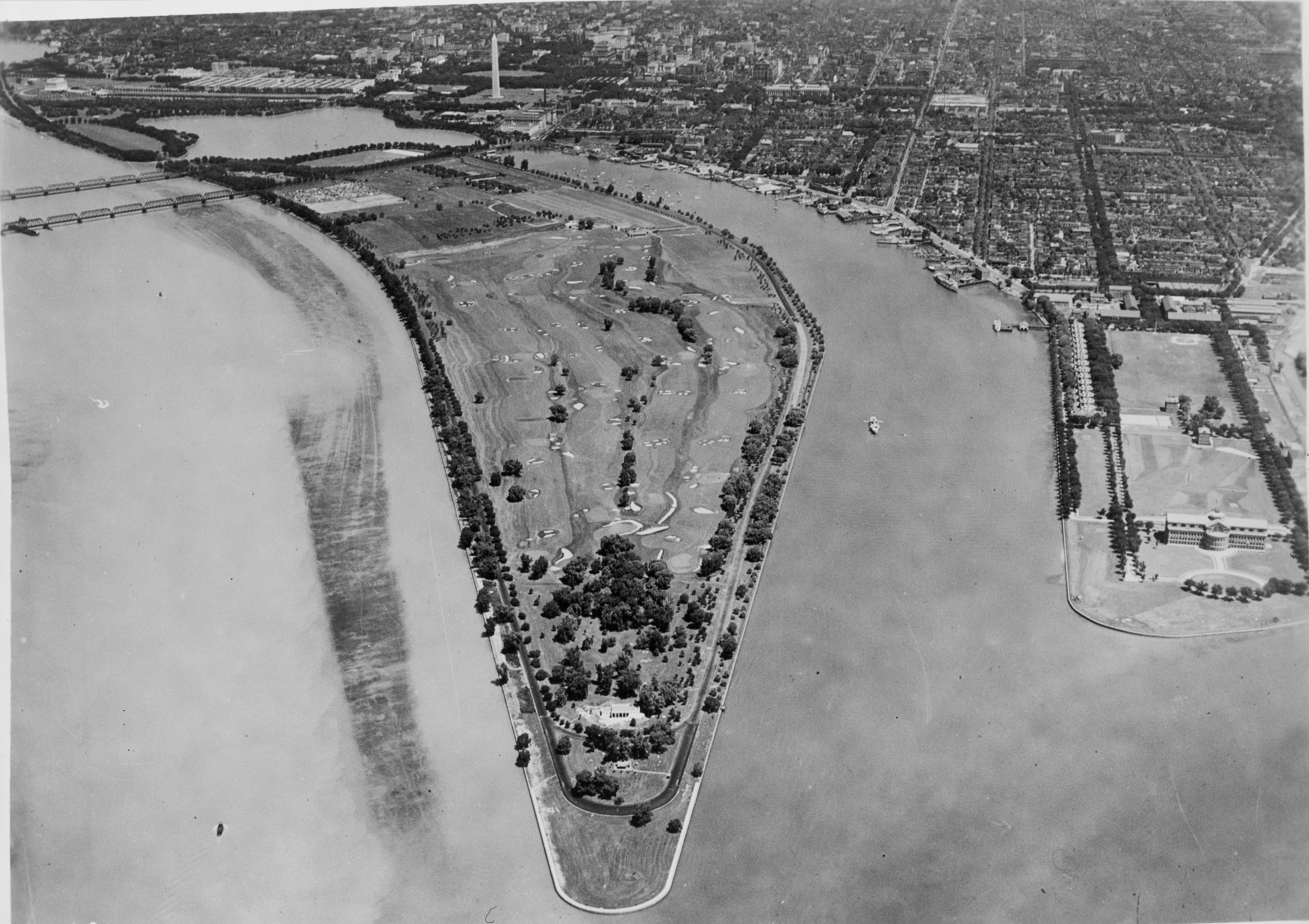
Aerial view of Hains Point and East Potomac Park, c. 1935

Although the shoreline of the Potomac River in the District of Columbia was likely to have been littered with shoals, sandbars, and marsh flats, no documentation of these was undertaken until 1834. At that time, the United States Army's Corps of Topographical Engineers identified extensive tidal flats below Long Bridge (the predecessor structure to the 14th Street Bridge). These varied in size, but the largest was 100 acres (400,000 m^{2}) in size at low tide. By 1881, these extended from about the Old Naval Observatory down to Buzzard Point. Near the modern intersection of 17th Street NW and Constitution Avenue NW, the city's sewer system discharged into an extensive tidal flat, known as Kidwell's Meadows. Exposed to the air about half the time, the sewage began decomposing, creating a powerful, rank smell.

The southern part of the Pennsylvania Avenue district was flooded many times in the last three decades of the 19th century. Major floods occurred in October 1870 (during which Chain Bridge was destroyed), February 1881, November 1887, and June 1889 (the same storm which caused the Johnstown Flood). Floodwaters were high enough that rowboats were used on the avenue, and horse-drawn streetcars saw water reach the bottom of the trams. After a disastrous flood in 1881, the United States Army Corps of Engineers dredged a deep channel in the Potomac and used the material to fill in the Potomac (creating the current banks of the river) and raise much of the land near the White House and along Pennsylvania Avenue NW by nearly 6 feet (1.8 m). Much of the dredged material was used to build up the existing tidal flats in the Potomac River as well as sandbars which had been created by silting around Long Bridge. Reclamation occurred in three phases: Section 1 became 135-acre (550,000 m^{2}) West Potomac Park, section 2 became the 277-acre (1,120,000 m^{2}) area around the Tidal Basin, and section 3 became the 327-acre (1,320,000 m^{2}) East Potomac Park. Congress formally designated these areas "Potomac Park and to be forever held and used as a park for the recreation and pleasure of the people." on March 3, 1897.

To ensure that the island was not eroded by the river, poplars and willows were planted along edge of the island to stabilize the shoreline. Over the next two decades, most of East Potomac Park lay untouched, and dense thickets of trees and brush grew up on the island. Dredging of the Potomac River continued even after East Potomac Park was considered finished, and additional dredged material was placed on the island in late 1900, 1901, 1902, 1903, 1904, and 1907.

Beginning in late 1907, a bridge was built across the Tidal Basin Outlet Channel, carrying the Washington, Alexandria, and Mount Vernon Electric Railway (a streetcar line) over the Washington Channel and the Long Bridge into Virginia. This was completed in June 1908. More dredge material was deposited on the island in 1909, 1911, and 1912.

In 1900, the United States Senate established the Senate Park Commission to reconcile competing visions for the development of Washington, D.C., and the parks within it. Better known as the McMillan Commission, because of its influential chairman, Senator James McMillan, the commission released a document known as McMillan Plan in 1902. The McMillan Plan called for turning the undeveloped land into a formal park with extensive recreation facilities.

== Park establishment ==
Infilling of the East Potomac Park island continued long after the island was considered complete. In 1906, a large elliptical depression covering about 14 acres (57,000 m^{2}) existed in the center of the island. Due to the distance to shore, the Corps of Engineers felt it was not feasible to fill in the area. But a contractor, eager to be rid of dredged material, filled it in for free in 1908. A portion of the park then served in 1910 as a nursery for providing trees, shrubs, and flowers for Congress, the White House, and other governmental agencies.

Congress gave permission for the Corps to open East Potomac Park to the public in August 1912. In September 1912, the Corps began construction of a 30-foot-wide (9.1 m) road on the Potomac River shoreline of East Potomac Park. Work continued on the Potomac River shoreline in 1914, and continued up the Washington Channel side. The road on the Channel side was completed in spring 1915, leaving a temporary road around the southern tip of the island. This portion of the road was finished in late June 1915.

Congress transferred jurisdiction of East Potomac Park to the District of Columbia from the federal government in legislation enacted on August 1, 1914. At the time, public works in the District of Columbia were overseen by the Army Corps of Engineers, so this legislation effectively placed the park under the Corps' jurisdiction.

Spring 1915 saw the Corps extensively landscape East Potomac Park for the first time, planting 46,650 shrubs and flowering plants and 203 Japanese cherry trees (or sakura) along the roadway. Another 133 Japanese cherry trees were planted in spring 1916. (Note: All of the cherry trees in East Potomac Park are cultivars of Prunus serrulata, the Japanese Cherry. Nearly all of them are Prunus 'Kanzan' (also known as 'Kwanzan', 'Sekiyama' and 'Sekizan'). These trees have pink blossoms of about 30 petals each, which hang in clusters of three to five blossoms. About 14 of the cherry trees in East Potomac Park are Prunus serrulata 'Fugenzo', another cultivar with rose-pink blossoms. There is a single example of a Prunus serrulata 'Shiro-fugen', a white-blossomed tree. All three cultivars bloom about two weeks later than the more famous white-blossomed hybrid cherry Prunus × yedoensis and the pink-fading-to-white blossomed Prunus x yedoensis 'Akebono' cultivar, which are common around the Tidal Basin.)

One of the first structures added to East Potomac Park was the National Park Service (NPS) lodge. The Corps of Engineers had originally proposed constructing a small lodge in East Potomac Park in 1908 to serve as a tool shed and public toilet and to serve as a shelter for police patrolling the park. But Congress did not approve this plan. Instead, a lodge originally built in Franklin Square in downtown Washington, D.C., about 1867 was moved to the north end of East Potomac Park, near the Washington Channel shoreline, between 1913 and June 1915. (Note: Sources differ as to when the move occurred. The Army Corps of Engineers said in June 1915 that the lodge had been moved within the previous 12 months, putting the move in the last half of 1914 or the first half of 1915. But the National Park Service said in 2005 that the move occurred in 1913.) The National Park Service used the structure for various purposes until 1965, when Congress established the National Mall and Memorial Parks administrative unit of the National Park Service's National Capital Parks. The unit has used the lodge for its headquarters ever since.

Bridle paths for horseback riding were also constructed in the park in 1913, and significantly expanded in summer 1915 and spring 1916. The first three of the park's many baseball diamonds were established in early 1915, and extensive cinder-lined walking paths constructed in summer 1915 and spring 1916. The Corps proceeded to clear grade, plow, and seed 88 acres (360,000 m^{2}) of land in the center of the park for use as athletic fields in the summer of 1916 and again in the spring of 1917. But this land was turned over to the Boy Scouts of America for use as a victory garden.

Hains Point is named in memory of Peter Conover Hains (1840–1921), Major General, United States Army, who is buried in Arlington National Cemetery. He designed the Tidal Basin in Washington, D.C., which solved drainage problems and foul smell in much of the Washington area marshlands.

=== Golf course and fieldhouses ===
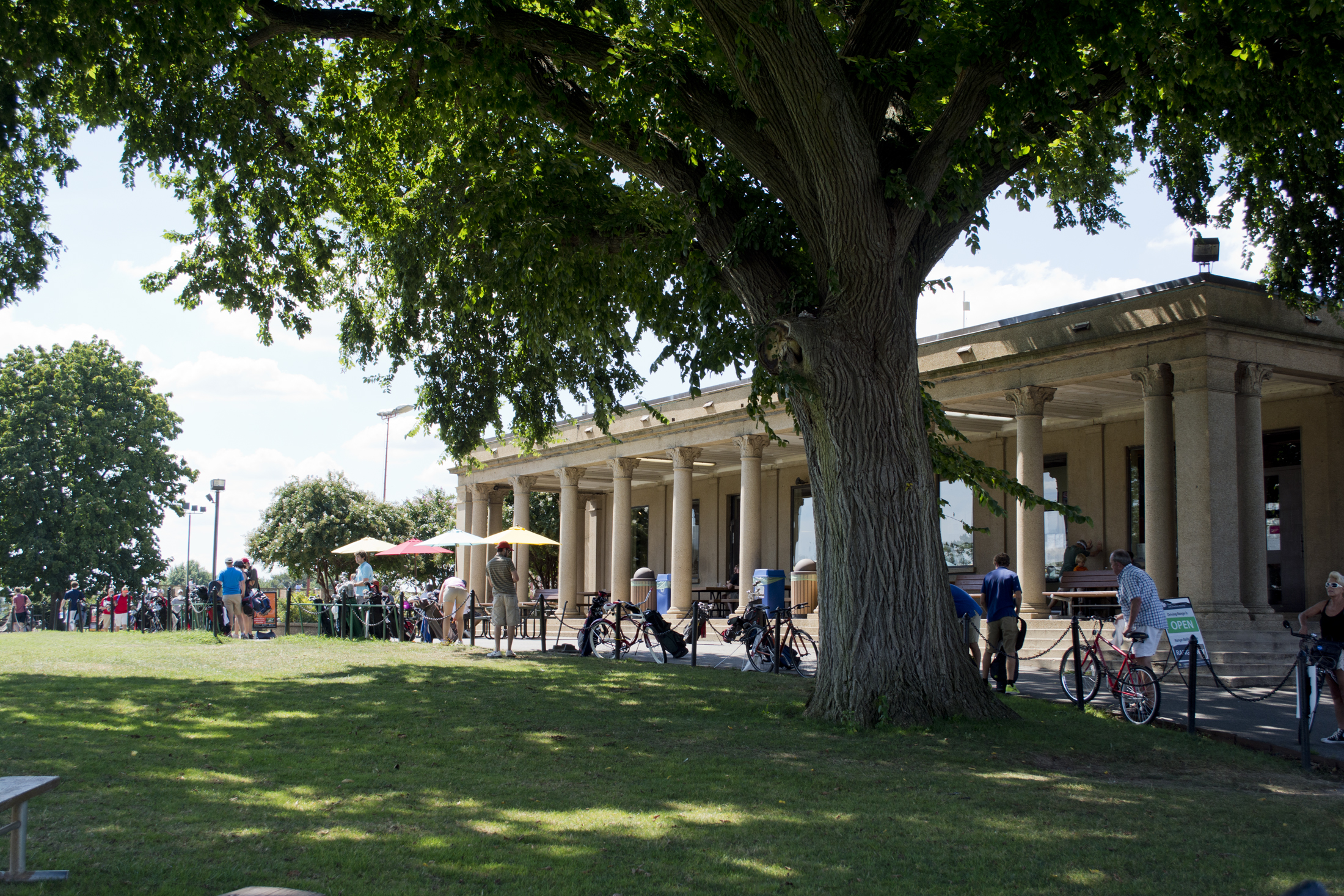
Southern fieldhouse, finished in 1921, now used as the pro shop and cafeteria of the East Potomac Park Golf Course.

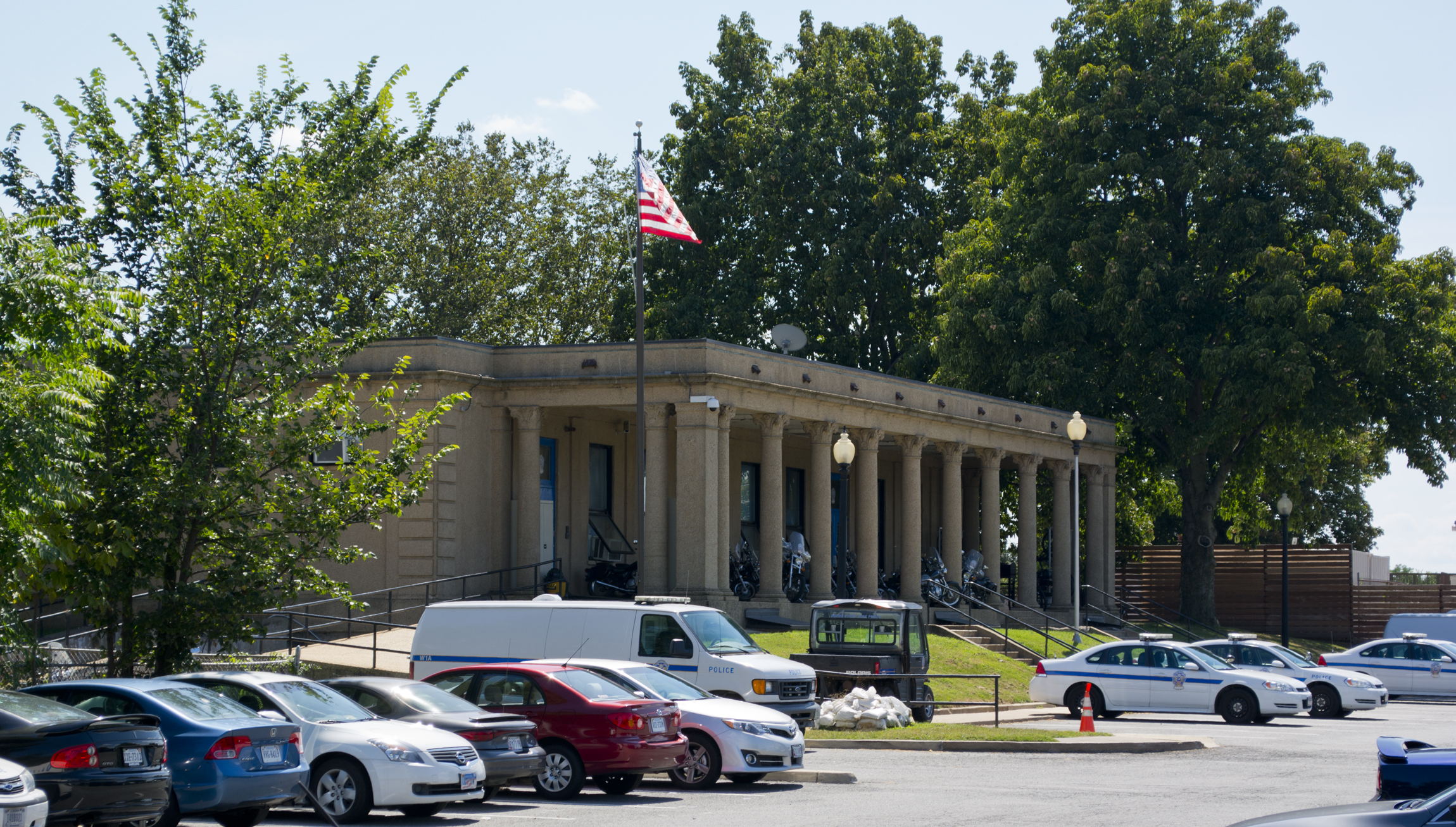
Northern fieldhouse, finished in 1921, now used as the U.S. Park Police District 1 station.

Much of the park remained undeveloped until 1913, when a fieldhouse with lockers and showers was proposed by the United States Army Corps of Engineers for construction toward the center of the park. No funding for the fieldhouse was provided, but the following year the Corps of Engineers, acting on a request from local sportsmen, won approval for construction of a golf course on the lower two-thirds of the park. Work on the course was delayed for a variety of reasons, but construction finally began in January 1917, when golf course architect Walter Travis visited the city to see the site and begin designing the course. Although funding for construction was approved in May 1918, work was delayed during World War I as temporary soldiers' barracks were built in and victory gardens were extensively planted throughout East Potomac Park. The first nine holes opened on July 7, 1920. A three-hole practice course opened in June 1922, and was expanded to a full nine holes some time in 1923. The final nine holes opened in late September 1924.

Work on the fieldhouse occurred alongside the golf course. Construction by the A.C. Moses Construction Co. began in June 1917. By this time, the single fieldhouse had become two fieldhouses, each slightly L-shaped with the long wing of the building on a northeast-southwest axis. The two structures were connected by a breezeway on the south side. World War I delayed their completion, and funding for the structures was scarce. Only one fieldhouse was ready by June 1919, and little additional work had been completed by August 1921. But with the golf course rapidly expanding, the single fieldhouse was quickly overwhelmed. The first fieldhouse was finished and the second one begun and completed by December 1921.

A teahouse, a campground for tourists, and horse stables were built in the park in the 1920s. A four-mile-long pedestrian promenade was constructed around the park perimeter in 1935.

Until 1949, Black families were only allowed to picnic at Hains Point, and were forbidden from playing in the segregated golf, tennis, and swimming facilities.

=== Pool ===
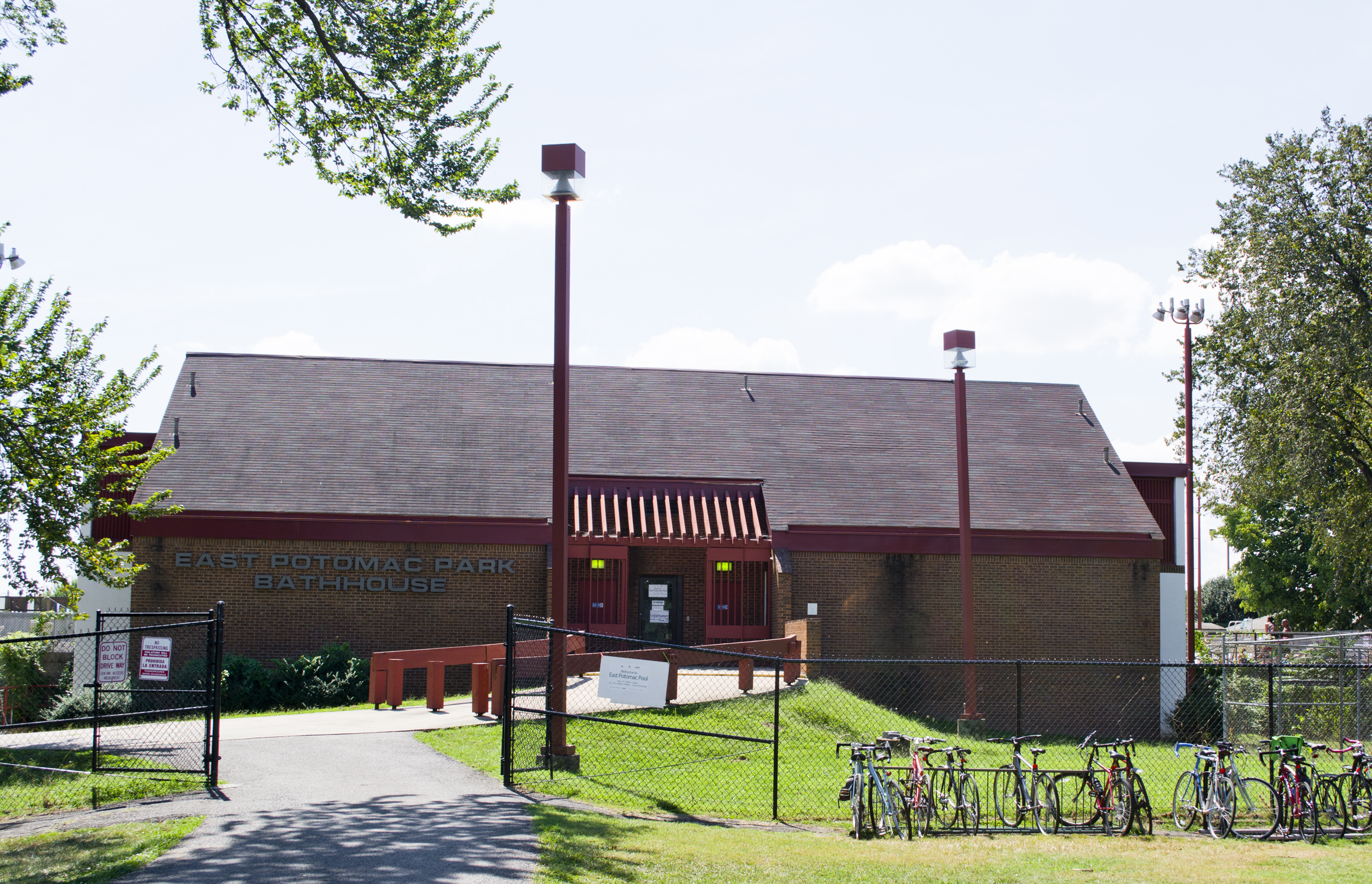
East Potomac Pool bath house, constructed from 1976 to 1977.

A pool was first proposed for East Potomac Park in 1927, to be located between the two fieldhouses (which would now serve as bath houses). This effort was a private one, but approved by the city. But no work on the project was made. It wasn't until April 1935 that the federal government approved and provided funding for a pool, and even then construction did not begin until 1936. By this time, a bath house was provided for pool users, so that the fieldhouses could remain dedicated to golf course users. A major flood damaged much of the pool construction work in July 1936, and the pool finally opened on June 4, 1937.

At some point in the 1950s, 1960s, or 1970s, the eastern fieldhouse was closed to the public and turned over to the U.S Park Police for use as their District 1 Station.

The pool and bath house remained largely as constructed until 1976, when the original concrete pool was removed and replaced with a pool consisting of an aluminum shell encased in fiberglass. The bath house was also replaced at this time. The original 1936 pool deck and underground pool structures remained in place, however.

The pool was closed at the end of 2016 for an upgrade. In 2020 the project was halted and the pool was "deconstructed" due to an erroneous report that mis-stated how far below the surface the groundwater is.

=== Mission 66 buildings ===
In 1956, the NPS adopted the strategic plan called Mission 66. This ten-year strategic plan was designed to bring all NPS facilities nationwide up-to-date, and construct new facilities where needed. Mission 66 proposed building three new structures in East Potomac Park. The first was the headquarters of the NPS's National Capital Region (NCR), constructed in the northern part of the park near the south shoreline and completed in 1963. (Note: The NCR structure had two wings. Wing A was three stories and Wing B was two stories. They were connected with a two-story glass atrium, which also served as the main entrance to the building. Both buildings had facades of limestone, marble, and beige brick.) The second was the headquarters of the United States Park Police (USPP), built adjacent to the NCR Headquarters and completed in 1964. Both buildings were designed by William M. Haussmann, an architect who was chief of the National Capital Office of Design and Construction in the National Park Service. (Note: The USPP headquarters, known as Wing D, was two stories high, and connected to Wing A of the NCR headquarters by a breezeway. It had a facade of limestone, marble, and beige brick.) In 1969, a one-story addition containing a cafeteria and training center was added to the north end of the NCR headquarters structure. (Note: This was known as Wing C.)

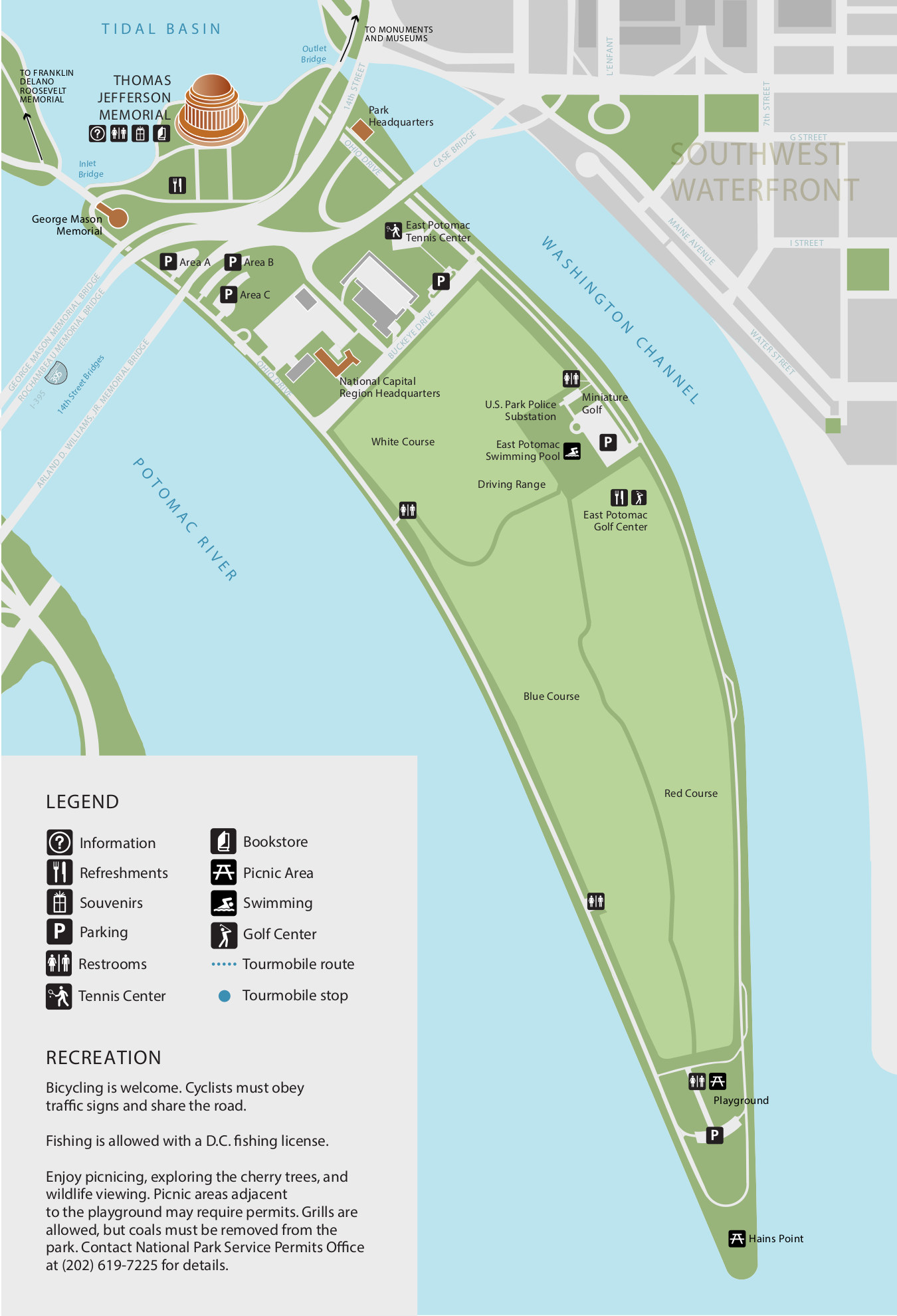
Park facilities map, c. 2014

In 2014, the 1913 lodge and the two fieldhouses were nominated for inclusion on the National Register of Historic Places. The latter buildings were hailed as being excellent examples of the Mission 66 style of architecture.

In 2015, the National Park Service proposed a major restructuring of all federal government operations in the Mission 66 buildings. The consolidation and renovations were needed because the NAMA headquarters and the USPP District 1 headquarters were both in a medium-risk floodplain expected to have a severe flood once in every 100 years. A portion of the USSP District 1 access road and grounds were in a floodplain expected to have a severe flood every 10 to 25 years. Additionally, planners noted that the USPP District 1 headquarters was not configured to meet heightened security needs in a post-9/11 world. NPS and USPP officials said they anticipated upgrading the HVAC and mechanical systems of the NCR headquarters, making the structure Americans with Disabilities Act compliant, and renovating the interior to create an open workspace from closed offices, which would allow far more efficient use of space and the demolition of some temporary office trailers currently on the northern corner of the complex's parking lot. A new 13,000-square-foot (1,200 m^{2}) USPP District 1 station would be constructed on the site of the temporary trailers, allowing the fieldhouse to be returned to public use. (There was no announcement made about the use of the 1913 lodge.) The $28 million project was being overseen by the architectural firm of Beyer Blinder Belle.

=== Further development ===
Beginning in 1971, the United States lightship Chesapeake was anchored off East Potomac Park in the Washington Channel. The ship drew 25,000 visitors annually until she was moved to Baltimore Harbor and loaned to the Baltimore Maritime Museum in 1982.

The Tidal Basin Outlet Channel Bridge, which now carried the 14th Street Bridge over the Washington Channel and East Potomac Park, was reconstructed in 1980.

Congress designated Hains Point, the southern tip of the park, as the site for a National Peace Garden in 1988. But authorization for the memorial expired without any construction occurring.

Hains Point was formerly the location of The Awakening, a sculpture by J. Seward Johnson Jr., which was installed at the Point in 1980. However, the sculpture was moved to the National Harbor, Maryland development on February 19, 2008.

In 2003, the United States Navy enclosed 4 acres (16,000 m^{2}) of the park between the NCR/USPP office building's parking lot and the railroad tracks, and constructed a large steel shed there. The construction bypassed normal review procedures for the use of public land and design of building in the National Capital Area, although members (but not staff) of the United States Commission of Fine Arts and the National Capital Planning Commission were later briefed about the project and sworn to secrecy. The ongoing activity, The Washington Post reported, is presumed to be related to national security. The Navy declined to address the project other than to say it was "utility assessment and upgrade", and that when the work was finished only a small utility shed will remain (with landscaping restored to its previous condition).

By 2015, East Potomac Park had fallen into disrepair. The 5-mile (8.0 km) long riprap seawall was disintegrating, sidewalks throughout the park were often cracked and buckled, and the miniature golf course was worn and dirty. A portion of the seawall and sidewalk along the southern tip of the park was in such bad shape that the National Park Service closed the area to all pedestrian traffic in 2014.

In October 2026, a federal judge decided that East Potomac Park, a public park in Washington, must remain open for the time being instead of closing for renovations suggested by President Donald Trump. Judge Ana Reyes halted the government's plan to close the park for 15 months to build a championship golf course, stating that the justification for the closure was deceptive and broke federal laws. Although the park will stay open, the government is not required to continue golf activities there.

== See also ==
- Cuban Friendship Urn

== Bibliography ==
- Bednar, Michael J. (2006). L'Enfant's Legacy: Public Open Spaces in Washington, D.C. Baltimore, Md.: Johns Hopkins University Press. ISBN 0801883180.
- Committee on Appropriations (1916). Development of East Potomac Park. Letter From the Secretary of War ad interim. United States House of Representatives (Report). Washington, D.C.: Government Printing Office.
- Davis, Timothy (2008). "Beyond the Mall: The Senate Park Commission's Plans for Washington's Park System". In Glazer, Nathan; Fields, Cynthia R. (eds.). The National Mall: Rethinking Washington's Monumental Core. Baltimore, Md.: Johns Hopkins University Press. ISBN 9780801888052.
- District of Columbia Department of General Services; District of Columbia Department of Parks and Recreation; HG Architects (June 3, 2015). East Potomac Pool, Washington, D.C. - Schematic Design: 06-03-2015 (Report). Washington, D.C.: HG Architects.
- District of Columbia Park Commission (1902). The Improvement of the Park System of the District of Columbia. Washington, D.C.: Government Printing Office. p. 119. "Potomac Park."
- Gutheim, Frederick A.; Lee, Antoinette J. (2006). Worthy of the Nation: Washington, D.C., from L'Enfant to the National Capital Planning Commission. Baltimore, Md.: Johns Hopkins University Press. ISBN 9780801883286.
- McClellan, Ann (2005). The Cherry Blossom Festival: Sakura Celebration. Boston: Bunker Hill Publishing. ISBN 9781593730406.
- Moker, Molly (2009). The Official Guide to America's National Parks. New York: Fodor's Travel Publishing. ISBN 9781400016280.
- National Park Service (2005). Cultural Landscapes Inventory: Franklin Park. National Mall & Memorial Parks - L'Enfant Plan Reservations (PDF) (Report). Washington, D.C.: National Park Service.
- National Park Service; United States Park Police; Beyer Blinder Belle Architects & Planners (July 31, 2015). NCRO, USPP, & NAMA Headquarters Renovation with United States Park Police New District 1 Station. National Capital Planning Commission Preliminary Approval Submission (Report). Washington, D.C.: National Capital Planning Commission.
- Senate Park Commission (1902). Report of the Senate Park Commission The Improvement of the Park System of the District of Columbia. United States Senate. Committee on the District of Columbia. Washington, D.C.: U.S. Government Printing Office.
- Tindall, William (1914). Standard History of the City of Washington From a Study of the Original Sources. Knoxville, Tenn.: H.W. Crew & Co.
- United States Army Corps of Engineers (1899). Report of the Chief of Engineers. Part 2. Annual Reports of the War Department for the Fiscal Year Ended June 30, 1899 (Report). Washington, D.C.: U.S. Government Printing Office.
- United States Army Corps of Engineers (1901). Report of the Chief of Engineers. Part 1. Annual Reports of the War Department for the Fiscal Year Ended June 30, 1901 (Report). Washington, D.C.: U.S. Government Printing Office.
- United States Army Corps of Engineers (1902). Report of the Chief of Engineers. Part 1. Annual Reports of the War Department for the Fiscal Year Ended June 30, 1902 (Report). Washington, D.C.: U.S. Government Printing Office.
- United States Army Corps of Engineers (1903). Report of the Chief of Engineers. Volume X. Part 2. Annual Reports of the War Department for the Fiscal Year Ended June 30, 1903 (Report). Washington, D.C.: U.S. Government Printing Office.
- United States Army Corps of Engineers (1904). Report of the Chief of Engineers. Volume V. Part 1. Annual Reports of the War Department for the Fiscal Year Ended June 30, 1904 (Report). Washington, D.C.: U.S. Government Printing Office.
- United States Army Corps of Engineers (1907). Report of the Chief of Engineers, U.S. Army, 1907. Part 2. Annual Reports, War Department, Fiscal Year Ended June 30, 1907 (Report). Washington, D.C.: U.S. Government Printing Office.
- United States Army Corps of Engineers (1908). Report of the Chief of Engineers, U.S. Army, 1908. Part 3. Annual Reports, War Department, Fiscal Year Ended June 30, 1908 (Report). Washington, D.C.: U.S. Government Printing Office.
- United States Army Corps of Engineers (1909). Report of the Chief of Engineers, U.S. Army, 1909. Part 1. Annual Reports, War Department, Fiscal Year Ended June 30, 1909 (Report). Washington, D.C.: U.S. Government Printing Office.
- United States Army Corps of Engineers (1910). Report of the Chief of Engineers, U.S. Army, 1910. Part 3. Annual Reports, War Department, Fiscal Year Ended June 30, 1910 (Report). Washington, D.C.: U.S. Government Printing Office.
- United States Army Corps of Engineers (1911). Report of the Chief of Engineers, U.S. Army, 1911. Part 1. Annual Reports, War Department, Fiscal Year Ended June 30, 1911 (Report). Washington, D.C.: U.S. Government Printing Office.
- United States Army Corps of Engineers (1912). Report of the Chief of Engineers, U.S. Army, 1912. Part 1. Annual Reports, War Department, Fiscal Year Ended June 30, 1912 (Report). Washington, D.C.: U.S. Government Printing Office.
- United States Army Corps of Engineers (1913). Report of the Chief of Engineers, U.S. Army, 1913. Part 3. Annual Reports, War Department, Fiscal Year Ended June 30, 1913 (Report). Washington, D.C.: U.S. Government Printing Office.
- United States Army Corps of Engineers (1914). Report of the Chief of Engineers, U.S. Army, 1914. Part 1. Annual Reports, War Department, Fiscal Year Ended June 30, 1914 (Report). Washington, D.C.: U.S. Government Printing Office.
- United States Army Corps of Engineers (1915). Report of the Chief of Engineers, U.S. Army, 1915. Part 3. Annual Reports, War Department, Fiscal Year Ended June 30, 1915 (Report). Washington, D.C.: U.S. Government Printing Office.
- United States Army Corps of Engineers (1916). Report of the Chief of Engineers, U.S. Army, 1916. Part 1. Annual Reports, War Department, Fiscal Year Ended June 30, 1916 (Report). Washington, D.C.: U.S. Government Printing Office.
- United States Army Corps of Engineers (1917). Report of the Chief of Engineers, U.S. Army, 1917. Part 1. Annual Reports, War Department, Fiscal Year Ended June 30, 1917 (Report). Washington, D.C.: U.S. Government Printing Office.
- United States Army Corps of Engineers (1918). Report of the Chief of Engineers, U.S. Army, 1918. Part 3. Annual Reports, War Department, Fiscal Year Ended June 30, 1918 (Report). Washington, D.C.: U.S. Government Printing Office.
- United States Commission of Fine Arts (1921). The National Commission of Fine Arts. Ninth Report, July 1, 1919 - June 30, 1921 (Report). Washington, D.C.: U.S. Government Printing Office.
- United States Secretary of War (1916). Development of East Potomac Park. Committee on Appropriates. U.S. House of Representatives. H.Doc. No. 1038. 64th Cong., 1st sess (Report). Washington, D.C.: U.S. Government Printing Office.
