= Higham (surname) =

Higham is a surname based on geographical locations in England — see Higham — and was originally for people from those locations.

Notable people with the surname include:

- Alice Higham, believed to be the birth name of Anne Line (c. 1563–1601), English Catholic martyr and saint
- Charles Higham (archaeologist) (born 1939), British-born New Zealand archaeologist
- Charles Higham (biographer) (1931–2012), English biographer and poet
- Clement Higham (before 1495–1571), English lawyer and politician, Speaker of the House of Commons and Chief Baron of the Exchequer
- Darrel Higham (born 1970), English rockabilly guitarist,
- Desmond Higham (born 1964), British mathematician
- Dick Higham (1851–1905), English-born American baseball player and umpire, only umpire to be banned from baseball
- Edward Higham (1846–1885), Australian politician
- Frank Higham (1905–1975), English footballer
- Gunner Higham (1887 – after 1920), English footballer
- Jennifer Higham (born 1984), British actress
- John Higham (Australian politician) (1856–1927)
- John Higham (historian) (1920–2003), American historian
- John Sharp Higham (1857–1932), British politician and businessman
- Mickey Higham (born 1980), English former rugby league player
- N. J. Higham (born 1951), British archaeologist and medieval historian
- Nicholas Higham (1961–2024), British mathematician
- Nick Higham (born 1954), British journalist and author
- Peter Higham (1930–2026), English football forward
- Roger Higham (by 1515–1558), also spelt Roger Heigham, Member of Parliament and Tudor Protestant reformer, grandfather of Alice Higham
- Ruth Higham (born 1978), English former model
- Scott Higham, American Pulitzer Prize-winning journalist and author
- Tim Higham, also known as Tim FitzHigham, English comedian, author, artist and world record holder
- Tom Higham (disambiguation), several people

== See also ==
- Higham (disambiguation)
- Haim, a given name and surname, including people with the surname (and given name) Hyam
- Heigham
- Hyams
