= Haim =

Male given name (חיים)

Haim – also spelled Chaim, Hayim, Hayyim, Hyam, Haym, etc. – can be a first name or surname originating in Hebrew or derived from the Old German name Haimo.

== Etymology ==
=== Hebrew ===
Chayyim (Hebrew: חַיִּים Ḥayyīm, Classical Hebrew: [ħajˈjiːm], Israeli Hebrew: [ˈχa.im, ħaˈjim]), also transcribed Haim, Hayim, Chayim, or Chaim (English pronunciations: /haɪm/ HYME, /xaɪm/ KHYME, /ˈxɑːjiːm/ KHAH-yeem), is a Hebrew name meaning "life", in Latin Vito and feminine Vita. Its first usage can be traced to the Middle Ages. It is a popular name among Jewish people. The feminine form for this name is Chaya.

Chai is the Hebrew word for "alive". According to Kabbalah, the name Hayim helps the person to remain healthy, and people were known to add Hayim as a second name to improve their health.

In the United States, Chaim is a common spelling; however, since the phonemic pattern is unusual for English words, Hayim is often used as an alternative spelling. The "ch" spelling comes from transliteration of the Hebrew letter "chet", which also starts words like Chanukah, Channa, etc., which can also be spelled as Hanukah and Hannah. It is cognate to the Arabic word حياة (ḥayāh), with the same meaning, deriving from the same Proto-Semitic root.

Common secular replacements for the name Haim include Heinrich and Harvey. Among Argentine Jews, the Spanish name Jaime (Spanish: [ˈxajme], a Spanish cognate of James) is often chosen for its phonetic similarity to Haim.

The names Vivian and Zoe have a similar meaning.

=== Old German ===
Early attested European forms of this etymology occur in Old German, as Haimo. This Old German name was borrowed into Old French, including into the Anglo-Norman dialect spoken in England, in forms including Haim. This became one source of the English surname Haim, along with variants like Hame, Haim, Haime, Haimes, Hains, Haines, Hayns, Haynes, Hammon and Hammond.

In 1881, three people in Great Britain bore the surname Haim and 67 the surname Haime. Around 2011, the numbers stood at 94 and 173 respectively, with two bearers of the surname Haim in Ireland.

== People with the given name ==
=== Haim ===
- Haim Arlosoroff (1899–1933), Zionist politician
- Haim Bar-Lev (1924–1994), Israeli military officer and government minister
- Haim Ben-Shahar (born 1935), Israeli economist and president of Tel Aviv University
- Haim Goldberg (1888/1890–1943), Polish-Jewish visual artist, writer and poet
- Haim Hanegbi (1935–2018), Israeli political activist
- Haim Harari (born 1940), Israeli theoretical physicist; president of the Weizmann Institute of Science
- Haim Hazan (born 1947), Israeli professor of sociology and social anthropology at Tel Aviv University
- Haim Hazan (basketball) (1937–1994), Israeli basketball player
- Haim Hazaz (1898–1973), Israeli novelist
- Haim Hefer (1925–2012), Israeli songwriter, poet and columnist
- Haim Nagid (1940–2025), Israeli poet and writer
- Haim Palachi (or Palagi, 1788–1868), Torah scholar
- Haim Revivo (born 1972), Israeli former international footballer
- Haim Saban (born 1944), Israeli-American media mogul
- Haim Starkman (born 1944), Israeli basketball player
- Haim Zafrani (1922–2004), Moroccan-born French scholar and writer

=== Hayim or Hayyim ===
- Hayim ben Bezalel (died 1588), German rabbi
- Hayim Nahman Bialik (1873–1934), Hebrew-language poet
- Hayim Katsman (1991–2023), Israeli academic and peace activist
- Hayyim Tyrer (died 1813), rabbi

=== Hyam or Haym ===
- Hyam Greenbaum, founder of the BBC Television Orchestra
- Hyam Maccoby (1924–2004), British scholar
- Hyam Plutzik (1911–1962), English poet and academic
- J. Hyam Rubinstein (born 1948), Australian mathematician
- Haym Salomon (1740–1785), primary financier of the American Revolution
- Haym Soloveitchik (born 1937), Jewish academic

=== Chaim ===
- Chaim ibn Attar (1696–1743), the Or Hachaim
- Chaim of Volozhin (1749–1821), rabbi, Talmudist and ethicist
- Chaim Benveniste (1603–1673), Ottoman rabbi
- Chaim Bloom (born 1983), American President of Baseball Operations for the St. Louis Cardinals
- Chaim Buchbinder (born 1943), Israeli basketball player
- Chaim Deutsch (born 1969), New York City Council member
- Chaim Elata (born 1929), professor emeritus of mechanical engineering and president of Ben-Gurion University of the Negev, and chairman of the Israel Public Utility Authority for Electricity
- Chaim Hames (born 1966), professor of history and rector at Ben-Gurion University of the Negev
- Chaim Herzog (1918–1997), Israeli president
- Chaim Kanievsky (1928–2022), Haredi rabbi and leader in Israel
- Chaim Koppelman (1920–2009), American printmaker
- Chaim Hezekiah Medini (1834–1904), the Sdei Chemed – Talmudic scholar and halachist
- Chaim Potok (1929–2002), American Jewish author
- Chaim Leib Shmuelevitz (1902–1979), Mirrer Rosh HaYeshiva
- Chaim Schreiber (1918–1984), British furniture manufacturer
- Chaim Topol (1935–2023), Israeli actor
- Chaim Weizmann (1874–1952), Israeli president
- Chaim Winant, birth name of H. M. Wynant (born 1927), American actor
- Chaim Witz, birth name of Gene Simmons (born 1949), Israeli-American co-founder of the band Kiss
- Chaim Zlotikman (born 1957), Israeli basketball player

== People with the surname ==
=== Haim ===
- Alana (born 1991), Danielle (born 1989) and Este Haim (born 1986), members of the American band Haim
- Corey Haim (1971–2010), Canadian actor
- Emmanuelle Haïm (born 1962), French harpsichordist and conductor
- Karima Mathilda Haim or Mathilda May (born 1965), French actress
- Mordechai Haim (born 1954), former Israeli footballer, father of the band members of Haim
- Ofir Haim (born 1975), Israeli football player
- Philippe Haïm (born 1967), French film director, writer and composer
- Salim Haim (1919–1983), Iraqi dermatologist
- Werner Haim (born 1968), Austrian ski jumper
- Yehoyada Haim (born 1941), Israeli diplomat

=== Hyam or Haym ===
- Barry Hyam (born 1975), English cricketer
- Dominic Hyam (born 1995), Scottish footballer
- Luke Hyam (born 1991), English footballer
- Nicola Francesco Haym (1678–1729), Italian opera librettist, composer, theatre manager, performer, numismatist
- Rudolf Haym (1821–1901), German philosopher
- Solomon Hyam (1837–1901), Australian politician
- Stephanie Hyam, British actress

=== Hayyim ===
- Aharon Ibn Hayyim (1545–1632), Biblical and Talmudic commentator
- Sulayman Hayyim (1887-1970), Iranian lexicographer
- Yosef Hayyim (1832–1909), Sephardic rabbi

== See also ==
- David Bar-Hayim (born 1960), Israeli rabbi
- Ben Haim, a surname
- Nahshon Even-Chaim or Phoenix (born 1971), Australian computer hacker
- Higham (surname)
- Hyams
- Hyman
- L'Chaim, a Jewish toast
