= Heigham =

Heigham is a surname. Notable people with the surname include:

- Anne Heigham (c.1563–1601), English Catholic martyr
- Clement Heigham (c.1495–1571), English lawyer and politician
- John Heigham (c.1568–c.1634), English Roman Catholic printer, writer, and translator
- Roger Heigham (c.1515–1558), English politician

Heigham, once a village and parish, is now a suburb of the city of Norwich.

== See also ==
- Higham (disambiguation)
- Higham (surname)
