= Ben Haim =

Ben Haim (Hebrew: בן חיים) or Ben-Haim (Hebrew: בן-חיים), also transliterated as Ben Hayim, Ben Hayyim and Ben-Chaim, is a Hebrew surname meaning "son of life" . Notable people with the surname include:

- Aaron ben Hayyim (fl. 1836), Russian exegete
- Avishai Ben-Haim (born 1968), Israeli journalist
- Baruch Ben Haim (1921–2005), American rabbi
- Eliyahu Ben Haim (born 1940), American rabbi
- Maxime Ben Haïm, Moroccan painter
- Paul Ben-Haim (1897–1984), Israeli composer
- Tal Ben Haim (born 1982), Israeli footballer
- Tal Ben Haim (footballer, born 1989), Israeli footballer
- Yaki Ben Haim (born 1976), Israeli businessman and politician serving as the mayor of Migdal HaEmek
- Yehuda Ben-Haim (1955–2012), Israeli boxer
- Ze'ev Ben-Haim (born 1907), Israeli linguist
- Zigi Ben-Haim (born 1945), American-Israeli sculptor and painter
- Zemah ben Hayyim (fl. 889–895), Gaon of Sura
