= William Arderon =

William Arderon (1703– 25 November 1767) was an English naturalist.

== Life ==
Arderon moved from Yorkshire to Norwich as an excise officer. There, influential contacts secured for him the post of managing clerk at the New Mills. He became close to Henry Baker, to whose works on the microscope he contributed.

Arderon was elected a Fellow of the Royal Society in 1745, and was later regarded as the founder of a school of naturalists and men of science in Norwich. He died 25 November 1767, and was buried in Heigham churchyard, near Norwich.

== Works ==
Arderon made numerous contributions to the Philosophical Transactions. He also left manuscripts on subjects connected with natural history and microscopy, journals, and correspondence with Henry Baker.

== Notes ==
Attribution

This article incorporates text from a publication now in the public domain: Stephen, Leslie, ed. (1885). "Arderon, William". Dictionary of National Biography. Vol. 2. London: Smith, Elder & Co.
