= Thomas Higham =

Thomas Higham may refer to:

- Thomas Higham (archaeologist), New Zealand archaeologist
- Thomas Higham (artist) (1795–1844), English antiquary and topographical engraver
- Thomas Farrant Higham, English classical scholar and translator
- Gunner Higham (Thomas Edwin Higham, 1887 – after 1920), English footballer

== See also ==
- Tom Higham (disambiguation)
