= Malmö Castle =

Castle in Malmö, Scania, Sweden

- Malmöhus
- Malmö
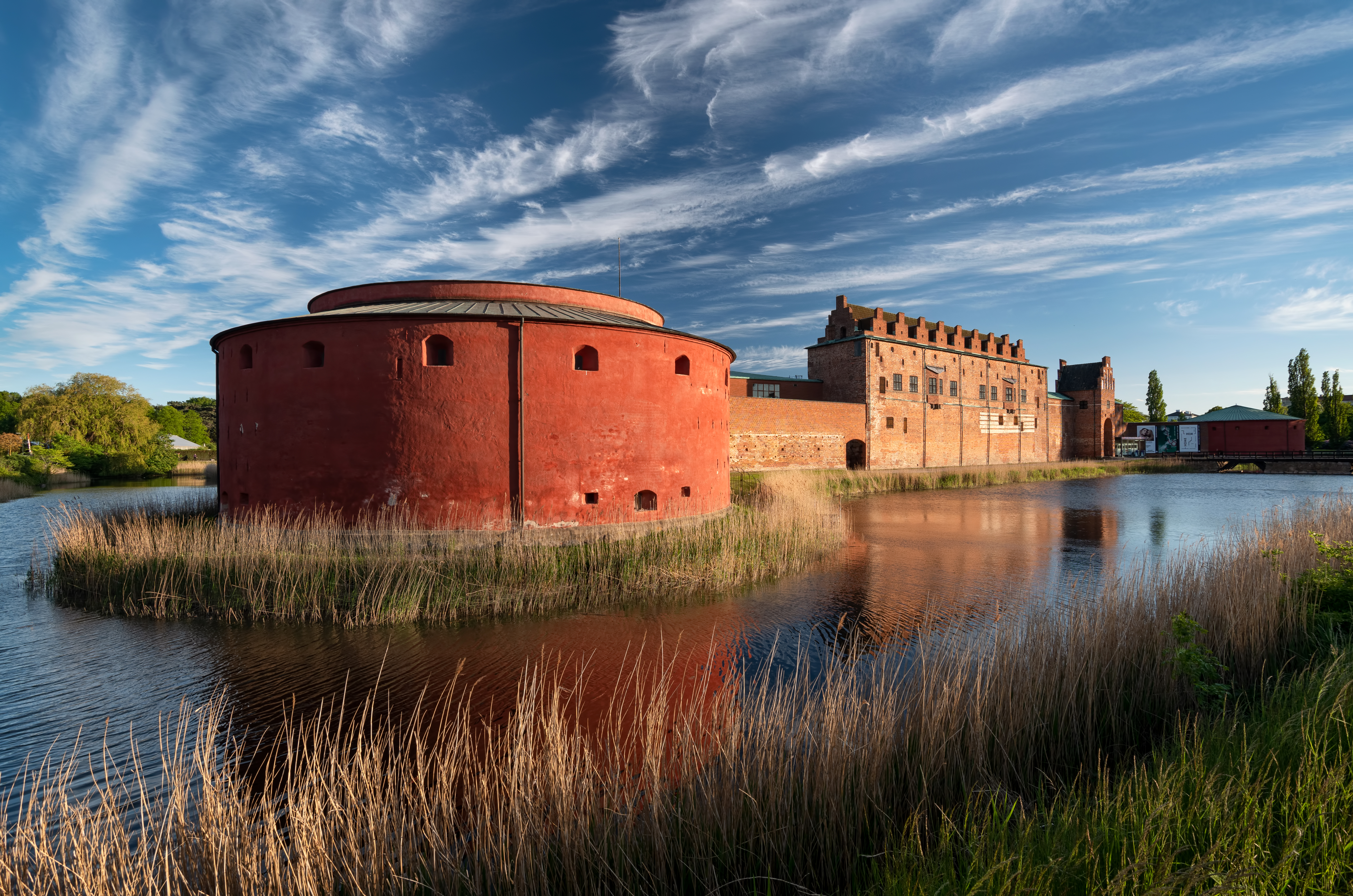
- Malmö Castle

Site information
- Type: Castle
- Open to the public: Yes

Location
- Scania, Sweden
- Location within Skåne Location within Sweden
- Coordinates: 55.6048°N 12.9875°E

Site history
- Built: 1434, rebuilt 1537

Malmö Castle (Swedish: Malmöhus or Malmöhus Slott) is a medieval castle located on Slottsholmen ("Castle islet") in Malmö, Sweden. It was built between 1526 and 1539 and is thus the oldest preserved Renaissance castle in the Nordic region. Malmö Castle is part of the Malmö Museum. It is owned by the Swedish state and managed by the National Property Board. It also houses the Malmö Art Museum. The Commandant's House (Kommendanthuset) and the Castle Mill (Slottsmöllan) are also located near the castle.

== Building history ==
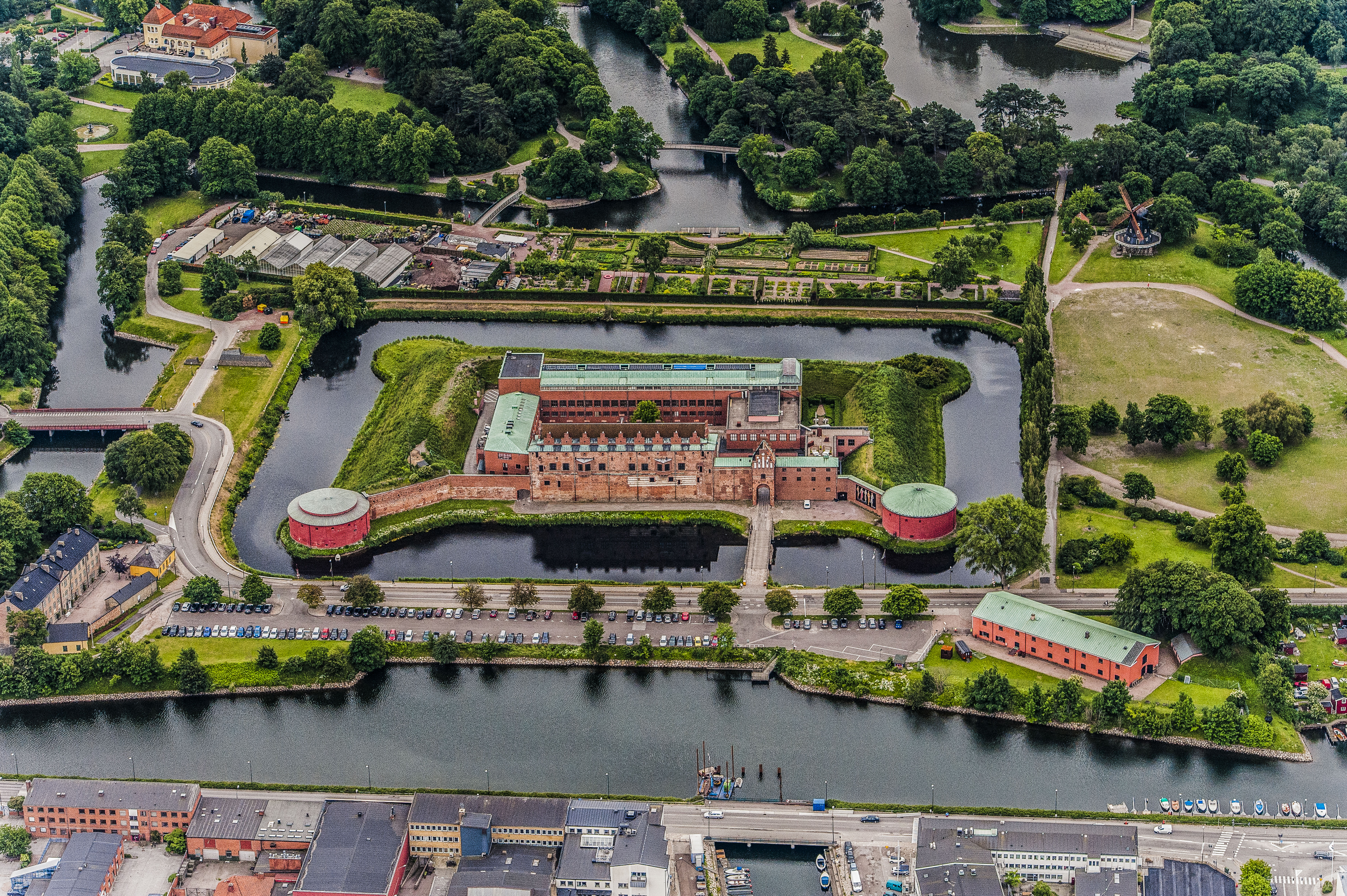
Aerial view of the front of the castle

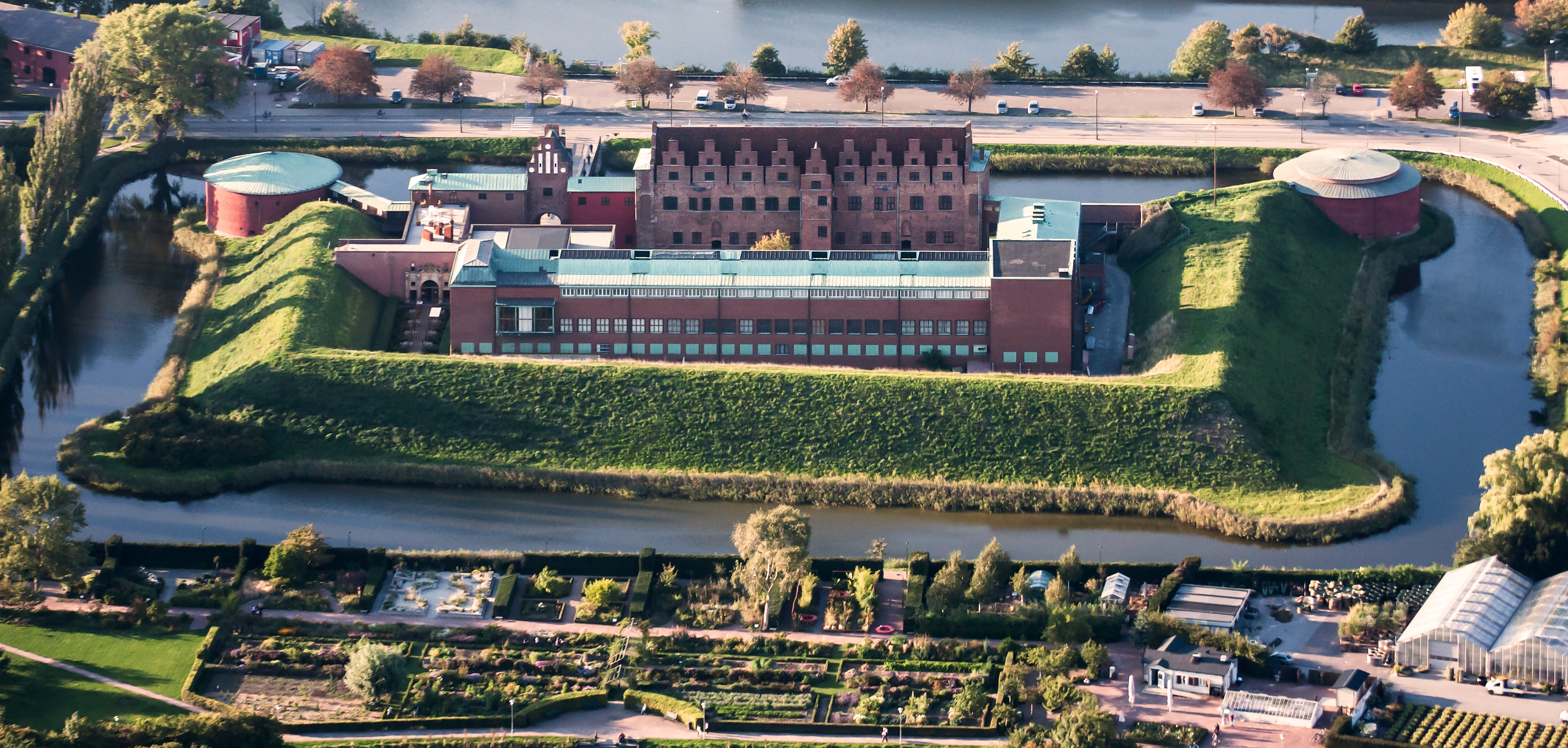
Aerial view of the rear of the castle

The Øresund toll, or the Sound Dues, was introduced in 1429 by King Eric of Pomerania. Any foreign ship that passed a line between Helsingør (Elsinore) and Helsingborg had to pay a toll. To strengthen the power the king exercised over the Sound, he built the Malmö fortress, founded the market town of Landskrona and made Copenhagen the capital. At Helsingør he built the castle Ørekrog or Krogen, the predecessor of Kronborg, while at the same time Helsingborg Castle was reinforced, which together monitored the customs.

As early as the 14th century there was a simple fortification for Malmö's defense. Construction of the Malmö Castle's predecessor began in 1434. King Eric of Pomerania ordered a major expansion of Malmö's seaward defenses. A seawall had been under construction in the city since the early 15th century. By royal order, this work was now accelerated, and the new fortress came to form the western defense point of this seawall. The fortress, known as Møntergaarden ("The Mint"), was of the castle type, i.e. a rectangular structure surrounded by high walls with a gate tower. The fortress once had an outer bailey to the east, but this disappeared when the present castle moat was built in the 1530s.

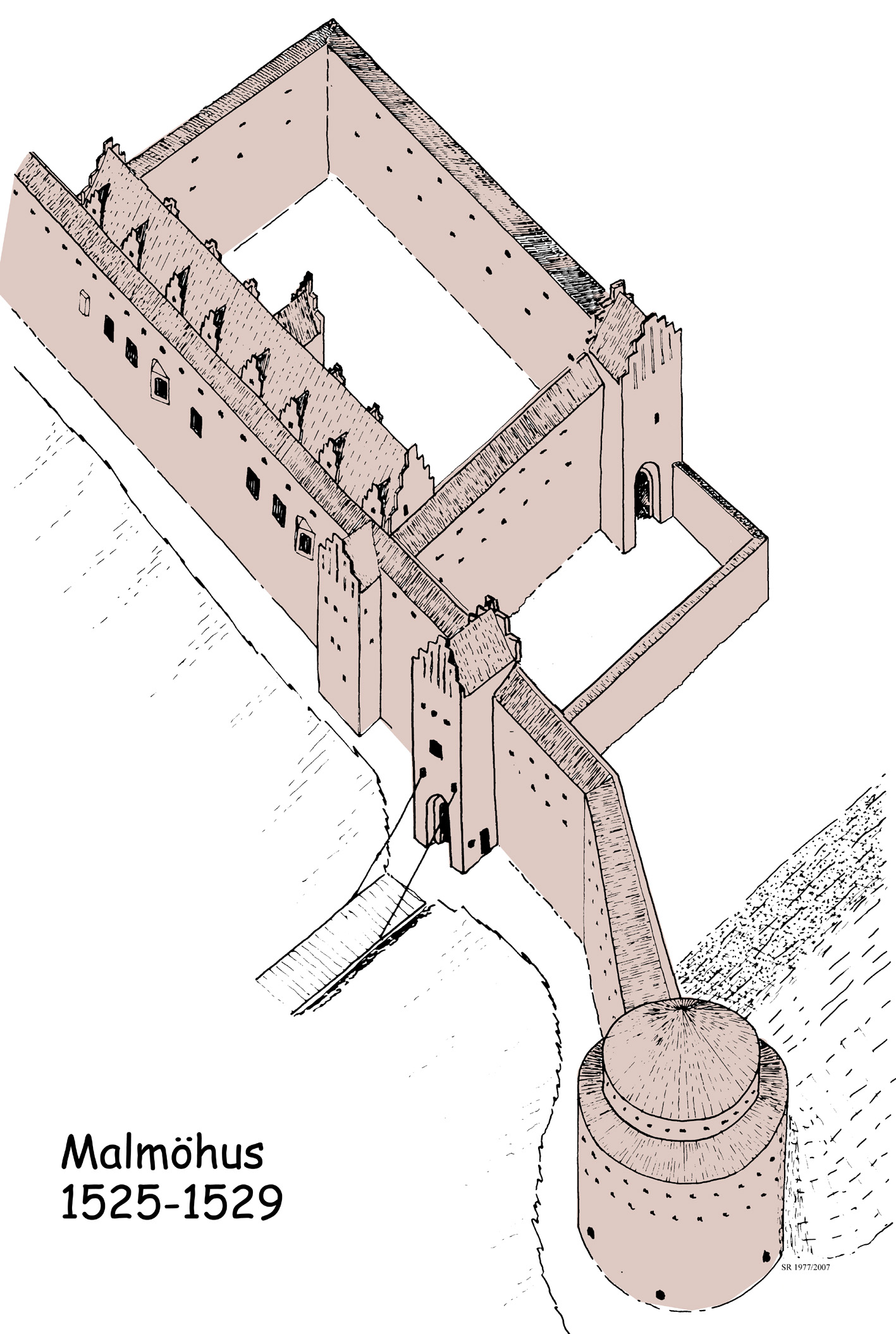
Malmö Castle. Reconstruction by Sven Rosborn.

In 1525, Frederick I ordered his lord of Malmö Fortress, Albert Jepsen Ravensberg, to build a new castle. In 1530, he was paid a huge sum (5690 marks) for four years of construction work. It was during this period that the current main building was erected. The inner courtyard of the castle was to be framed by a three-storey gateway. The entrance to the castle was moved at the same time with the addition of the western bailey. From the main building itself, a four-storey trench would also extend to both the west and east. In the west, this connected to the current gate tower, which originally had an additional floor. It is mainly through clear traces in the existing walls that the oldest building phases of the castle have been identified.

In 1529, a fire broke out at the castle. However, there is no information on how extensive this was. In the following year, the county revenues to be used for the construction of the castle were increased from 300 marks to 500 marks and in 1532 to a total of 888 marks. This shows that the construction of the present castle was going on during this time. In 1534, The Count's Feud broke out and the burghers demolished the huge wall with its ramparts that ran from the main building and surrounded the castle's inner courtyard. The damaged traces of this wall can still be seen in the main building, proof that the current castle was built before 1534. Literature about Malmö Castle often states that the current castle was built after the end of the count's feud, a statement that is thus difficult to reconcile with preserved building traces and accounts. Between 1537 and 1540, the castle was instead reinforced on the orders of Christian III by the construction of a moat and ramparts with four large brick corner towers. Historically, this fortress was one of the most important strongholds of Denmark.

== Personal history ==
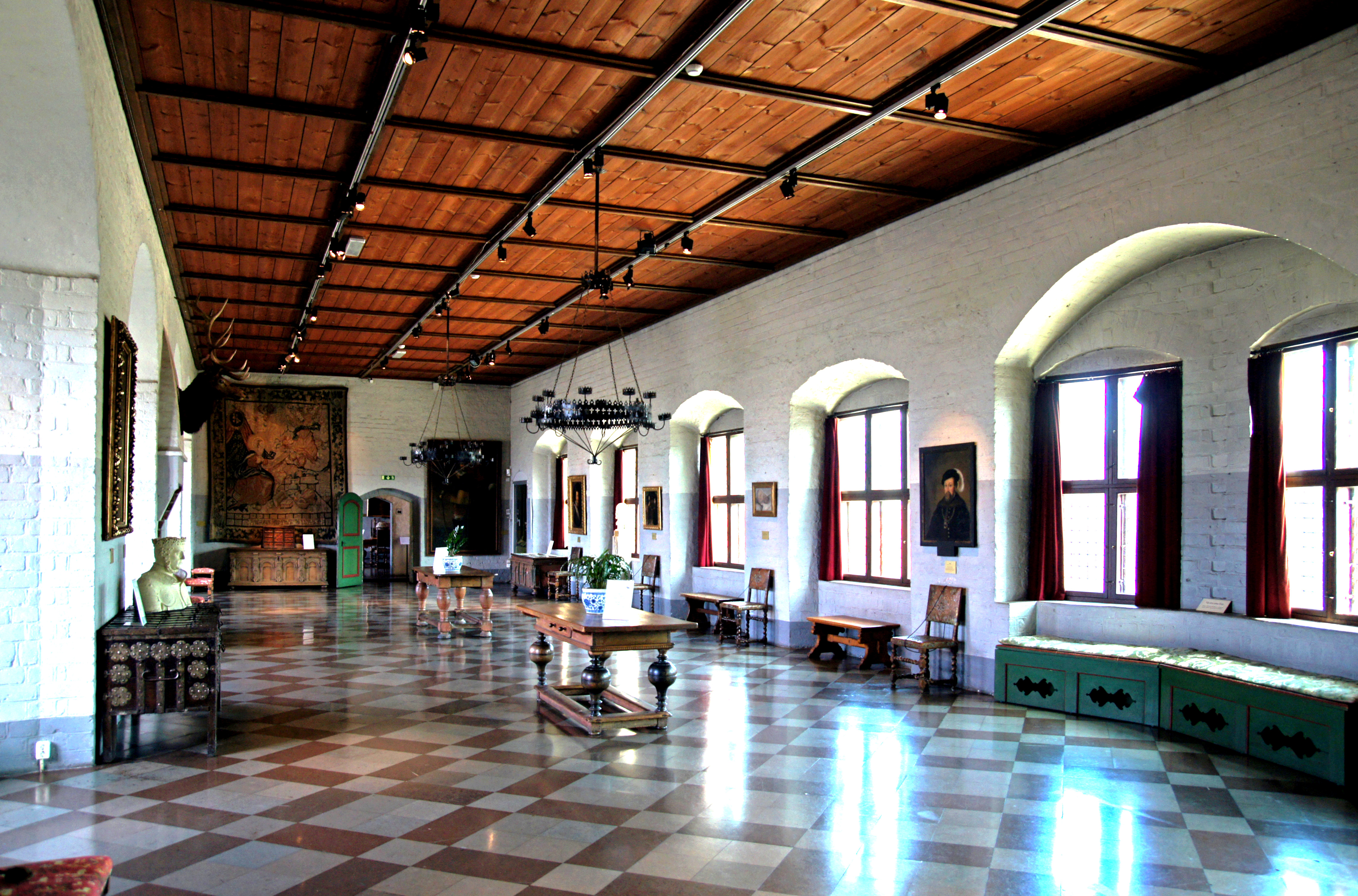
Malmö Castle interior.

In 1526, Malmöhus län was created by the withdrawal of the former Lindholm län, which consisted of the three hundreds of Oxie, Ingelstads and Järrestad's hundreds. Högby län (now Hyby in Bara härad) was also added. The revenue from the counties created the conditions for managing a large national castle like Malmö Castle. The lords of Malmö Castle were appointed by the king himself. They therefore usually came from Denmark's more wealthy noble families.

During the years 1554–1559, the heir to the throne, later King Frederick II, resided at Malmö Castle. Mary Stuart's third consort, the Earl of Bothwell, was imprisoned here from 1567 to 1573. The last Danish king to live at the castle for a short time was Frederick III in 1652. In the early Swedish period after 1658, the castle was used by the castle commissioners. It was also used to hold political prisoners, including Jörgen Krabbe and Anjala man Carl Gustaf Armfeldt the Younger, who died here in 1792.

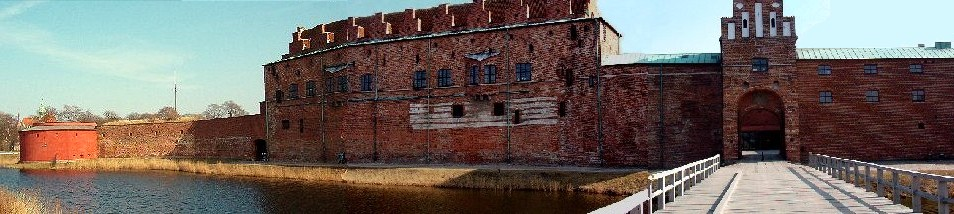
Malmö Castle and castle bridge, seen from the north.

== Prisons ==
In 1822, the buildings were handed over to the Prison Board and in 1828 the Malmö Correctionella Arbetshus (Malmö Correctional Workhouse) was opened, which was then Sweden's largest and most modern prison. A county prison according to the Separate system was built off the eastern side of the Malmö Castle moat in 1854–1855 with 102 light and five dark cells. After the castle fire of 4 September 1870, the large western wing building of Christian IV was demolished and replaced in 1876 by a central prison in a larger building with 137 cells and 304 accommodation places.

With the advent of the new central prison at Lundavägen in 1914, the facilities at Malmö Castle were taken out of use. However, prisoners were also received for a short time from 1919 to 1921. The buildings of the central prison were demolished in 1933. The county prison section was used as emergency shelter before being demolished in 1927.

== Museum ==
It was not until 1937 that the museum was able to move to the castle island. By then, the three prison barracks had been demolished and replaced by the current museum buildings. The castle building itself had already been restored in 1928 and gives an idea of what it looked like in the 16th and 17th centuries.

== Gallery ==
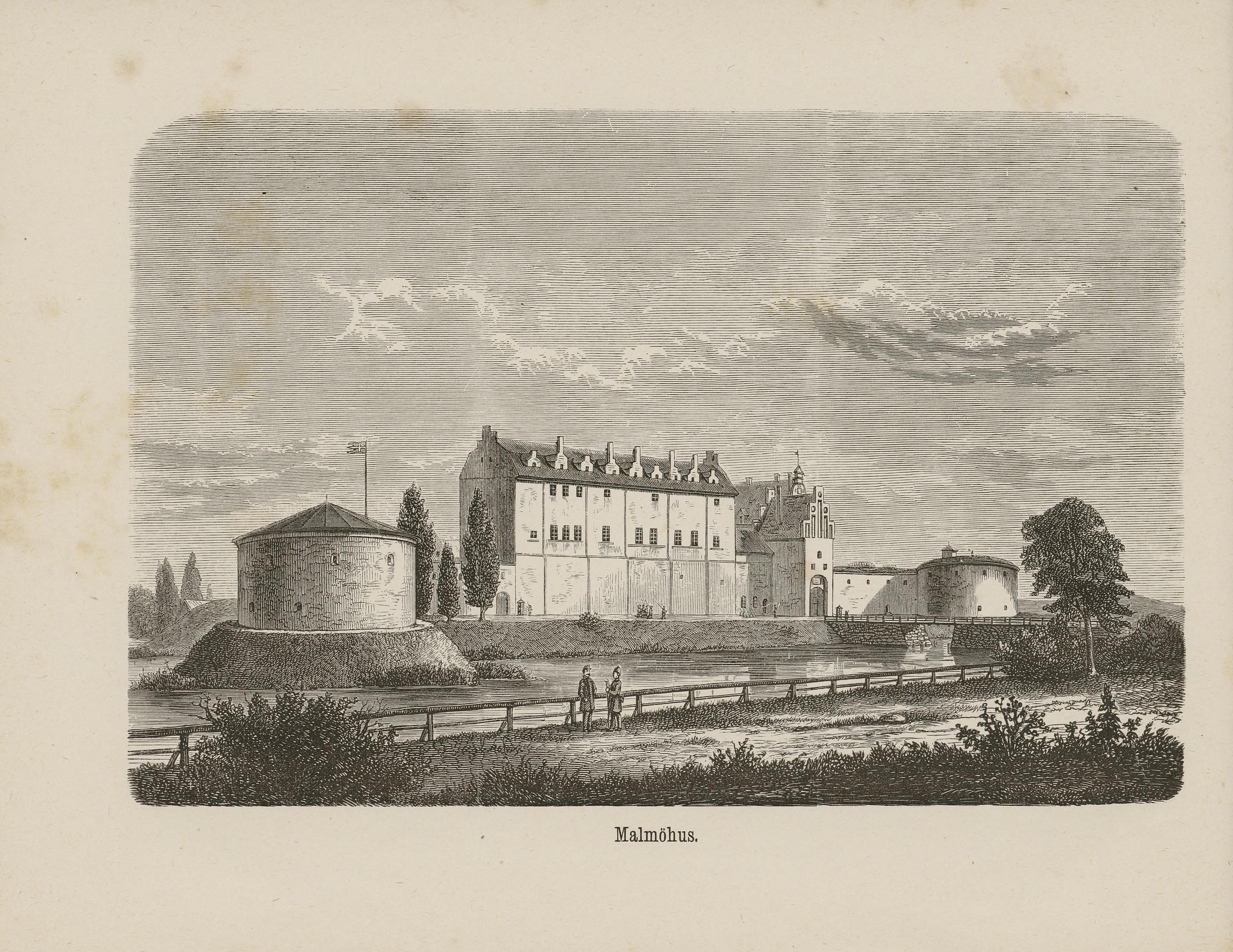
Malmö Castle around 1865, when it was used as a prison.

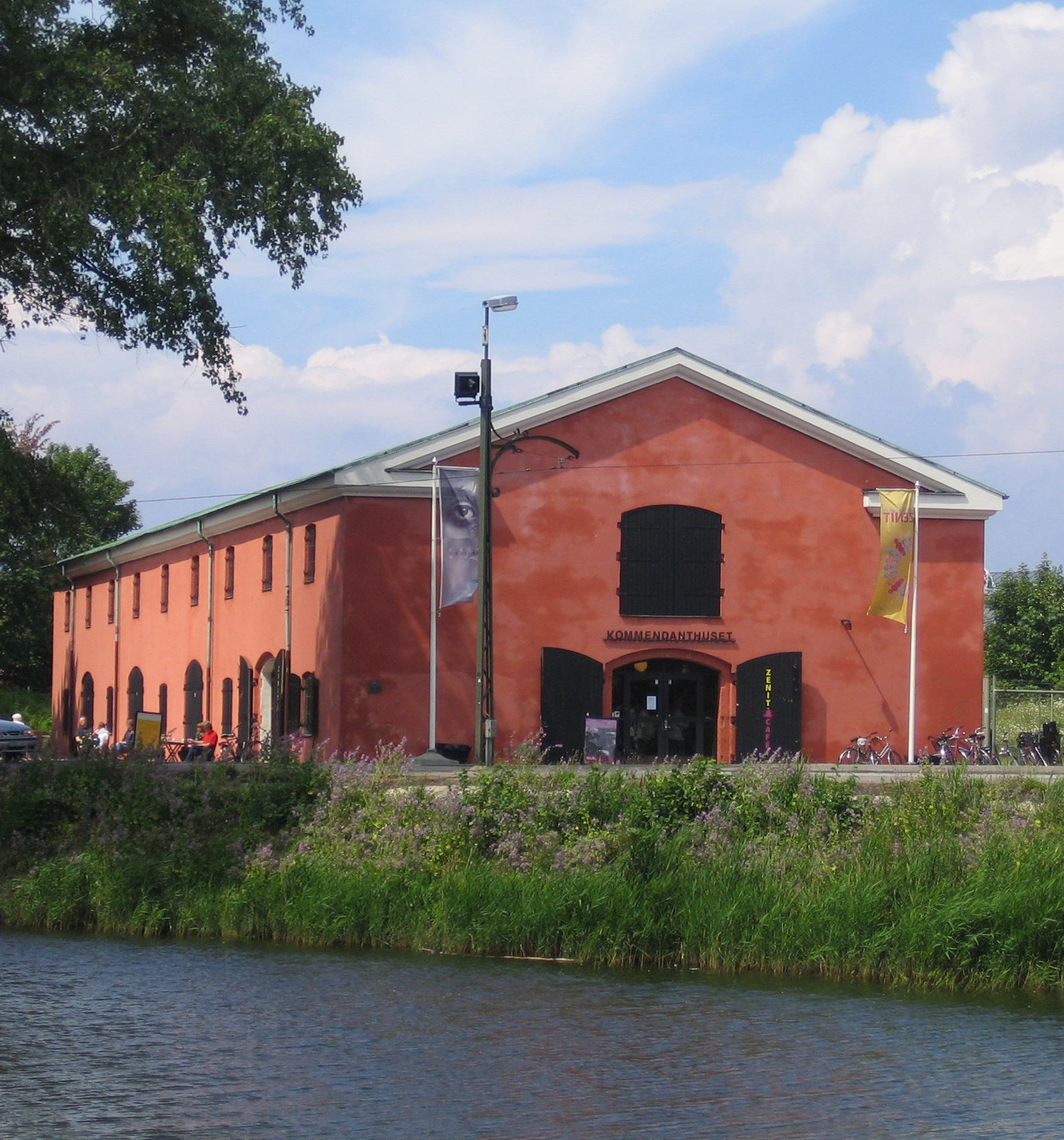
The Commandant's House (Kommendanthuset).

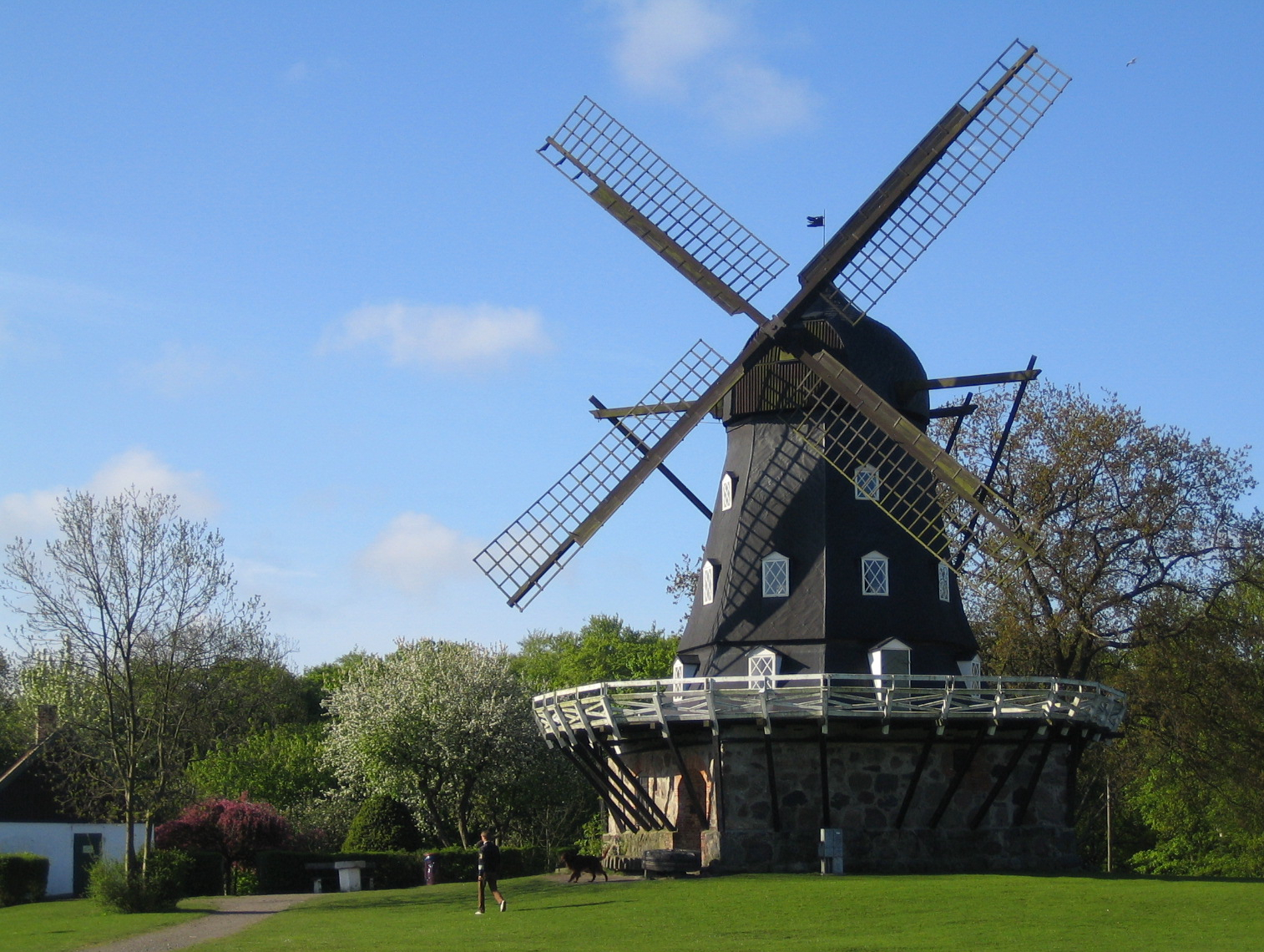
The Castle Mill (Slottsmöllan), an old windmill located on the remains of the bastion Stenbocken, southwest of the castle. Built in 1850 and put into operation in 1851, it is a smock mill that replaced the old post mill on the site.
