= Mark Barkworth =

English Roman Catholic priest and martyr

Blessed Mark Barkworth O.S.B
- Born: c. 1572; Searby, Lincolnshire
- Died: 27 February 1601 (aged 28 - 29)
- Beatified: 15 December 1929 by Pius XI

Mark Barkworth, OSB (alias Mark Lambert; c. 1572 – 1601) was a Catholic priest, oblate of the Order of St Benedict, and martyr.

== Life ==
Born around 1572 at Searby, Lincolnshire, he studied for a time at Oxford, though no record remains of his stay there. Originally raised as a Protestant, he was received into the Catholic Church at Douai in 1593, by Father George, a Flemish Jesuit, and entered the College there with a view to the priesthood. He matriculated at Douai University on 5 October 1594.

Due to an outbreak of the plague in 1596 Barkworth was sent to Rome and thence to the Royal College of St. Alban in Valladolid, Spain, where he entered the English College on 28 December 1596. On his way to Spain he is said to have had a vision of St Benedict, who told him he would die a martyr, in the Benedictine habit. While at Valladolid he made firmer contact with the Benedictine Order. He was ordained priest at the English College some time before July 1599, when he set out for the English Mission together with Father Thomas Garnet. On his way he stayed at the Benedictine Monastery of Hyrache in Navarre, where his wish to join the order was granted by his being made an Oblate with the privilege of making profession at the hour of death.

== Martyrdom ==
After having escaped from the hands of the Huguenots of La Rochelle, he was arrested on reaching England. and thrown into Newgate. At this time it was considered treason to be a priest in England who had been ordained abroad, and he was imprisoned for six months, and was then transferred to Bridewell. There he wrote an appeal to Robert Cecil, signed "George Barkworth". At his examinations he was reported to behave with fearlessness and frank gaiety. Having been condemned with a formal jury verdict, he was thrown into "Limbo", the horrible underground dungeon at Newgate, where he is said to have remained "very cheerful" till his death.

Barkworth was executed at Tyburn with Jesuit Roger Filcock and Anne Line, on 27 February 1601. He sang, on the way to Tyburn, the Paschal Anthem: "Hæc dies, quam fecit Dominus, exultemus et lætemur in ea" ("This is the day, the Lord has made, let us rejoice and be glad in it"). On his arrival he kissed the robe of Line, who was already dead, saying: "Ah, sister, thou hast got the start of us, but we will follow thee as quickly as we may"; and told the people that Pope St. Gregory had sent the Benedictine monks to evangelize England, saying "I am come here to die, being a Catholic, a priest, and a religious man, belonging to the Order of St Benedict; it was by this same order that England was converted." He was said to be "a man of stature tall and well proportioned showing strength, the hair of his head brown, his beard yellow, somewhat heavy eyed". He was of a cheerful disposition. He suffered in the Benedictine habit, under which he wore a hair-shirt. It was noticed that his knees were, like St. James', hardened by constant kneeling, and an apprentice in the crowd picking up his legs, after the quartering, called out: "Which of you Gospellers can show such a knee?" Contrary to usual practice, the quarters of the priests were not exposed but buried near the scaffold.

Barkworth was beatified by Pope Pius XI on 15 December 1929.

== See also ==
- Douai Martyrs

== Sources ==
- See: Godfrey Anstruther, Seminary Priests, St Edmund's College, Ware, 1968, vol. I, pp. 21–22, 116, 274-275.
