= Roger Filcock =

English Jesuit priest (died 1601)

Blessed Roger Filcock S.J.
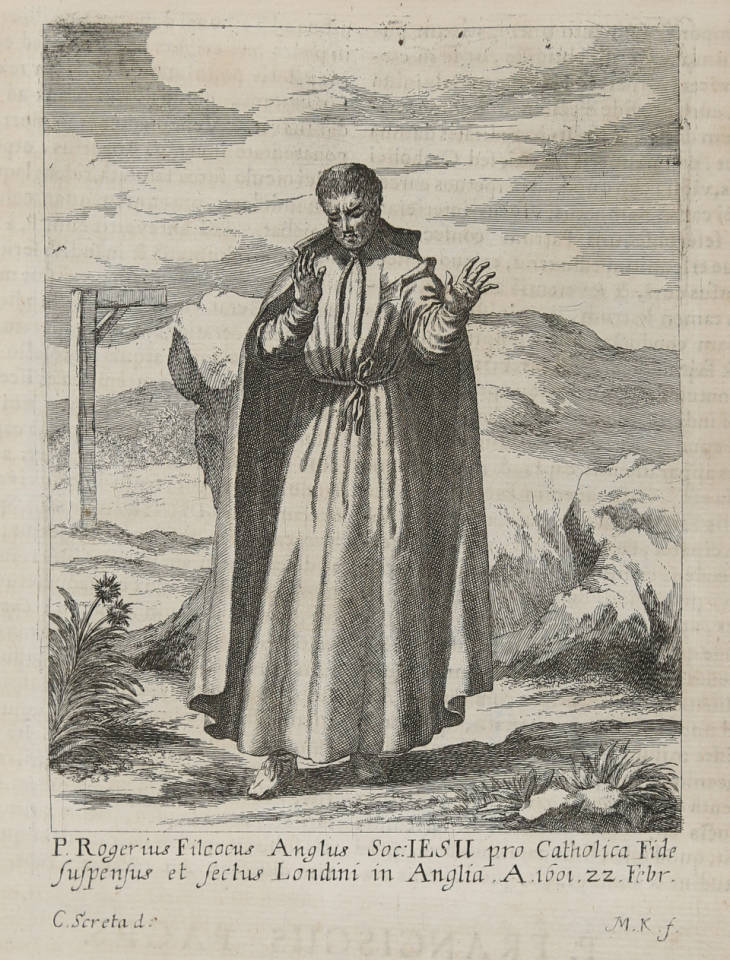
- Born: Sandwich, Kent, England
- Died: 27 February 1601; London
- Beatified: 22 November 1987 by John Paul II
- Feast: 27 February

Roger Filcock, SJ (alias Arthur Naylor) (died 27 February 1601, London) was an English Jesuit priest. He was beatified as a Catholic martyr by Pope John Paul II on 22 November 1987.

== Life ==
Born at Sandwich, Kent, England, the son of Simon and Margaret Lowe (or Low), he entered the English College at Rheims on 15 June 1581.

He studied at the English college in Rheims, France, and was amongst the first students to go to St Alban's seminary in Valladolid, Spain, where he was ordained in 1597. He desired to enter the Society of Jesus, but it was considered prudent that he first gain some experience on the mission.

He headed for Calais, France, on a ship which was pursued by Dutch ships. Rather than permitting themselves to be taken captive, many passengers jumped ship and successfully made it to shore. Filcock however, was captured but managed to escape and landed on the Kent shore of England in early 1598 where he assumed the alias of Arthur and began his priestly ministry. He was admitted as a Jesuit novice by Henry Garnet in 1600.

While waiting to go to Flanders for his novitiate, Filcock was apprehended, betrayed by a former fellow student at Valladolid and sent to Newgate prison in London. In 1601, Filcock was charged for being a priest but he would neither admit nor deny, insisting that witnesses and evidence be brought forth. As none was forthcoming, he was brought for trial and heard the indictment against him. He requested to be tried without jury because he did not want the verdict, which he knew would be against him, to be on the jurors’ consciences. Nevertheless, the judge directed the jury to find the defendant guilty and Filcock was sentenced to the gallows for high treason.

During his time as a missioner he had known Anne Line, a convert to the Catholic faith and widow whose husband had died in exile after being caught attending Mass. She had managed a variety of safe-houses for priests and lay faithful. Filcock had also been Line's confessor.

On Candlemas Day, 1601, Francis Page was about to celebrate Mass in her lodgings when priest-catchers broke in. The priest escaped in the confusion but his hostess was arrested and put on trial at the Old Bailey on 26 February 1601, indicted for harbouring a priest. She was condemned and led to the gallows the next day. She was executed at the same occasion as Dom Mark Barkworth, a Benedictine, and Filcock, who had gone on trial on 23 February. This was the first execution of Catholics at Tyburn since 1595.

Roger Filcock was beatified by Pope John Paul II on 22 November 1987.

== See also ==
- Douai Martyrs

== Sources ==
The most reliable compact source is Godfrey Anstruther's Seminary Priests, St Edmund's College, Ware, vol. 1, 1968, pp. 21–22, 116, 274–275.
