= Hyams =

Hyams (/ˈhaɪmz/) is a surname. Notable people with the surname include:

- Chapman H. Hyams (1838–1923), stockbroker, businessman and philanthropist
- Eban Hyams (born 1981), Indian-born Australian professional basketball player
- Edward Hyams (1910–1975), British writer
- Godfrey M. Hyams (1859–1927), American financier and philanthropist
- Harry Hyams, English millionaire and real estate developer
- Henry M. Hyams (1806–1875), Lieutenant Governor of Louisiana from 1862 to 1864.
- Henry Hyams (architect), British architect
- Joe Hyams, American columnist and author
- John Hyams, American filmmaker
- Leila Hyams, American actress
- Margie Hyams, American vibraphonist
- Nessa Hyams (1941–2026), American casting director
- Nina Hyams (born 1952), American professor of linguistics
- Peter Hyams, American film director
- Simone Hyams (born 1971), British actress
- Tony Hyams (born 1945), Australian businessman
- Tor Hyams, songwriter

== See also ==
- Hyams Beach
- Hyams Corporation in the Xenosaga games
- Haim, includes people with the given name Hyam
- Higham (surname), includes people with the surname Hyam
