= Zigi Ben-Haim =

Israeli artist

Zigi Ben-Haim זיגי בן-חיים
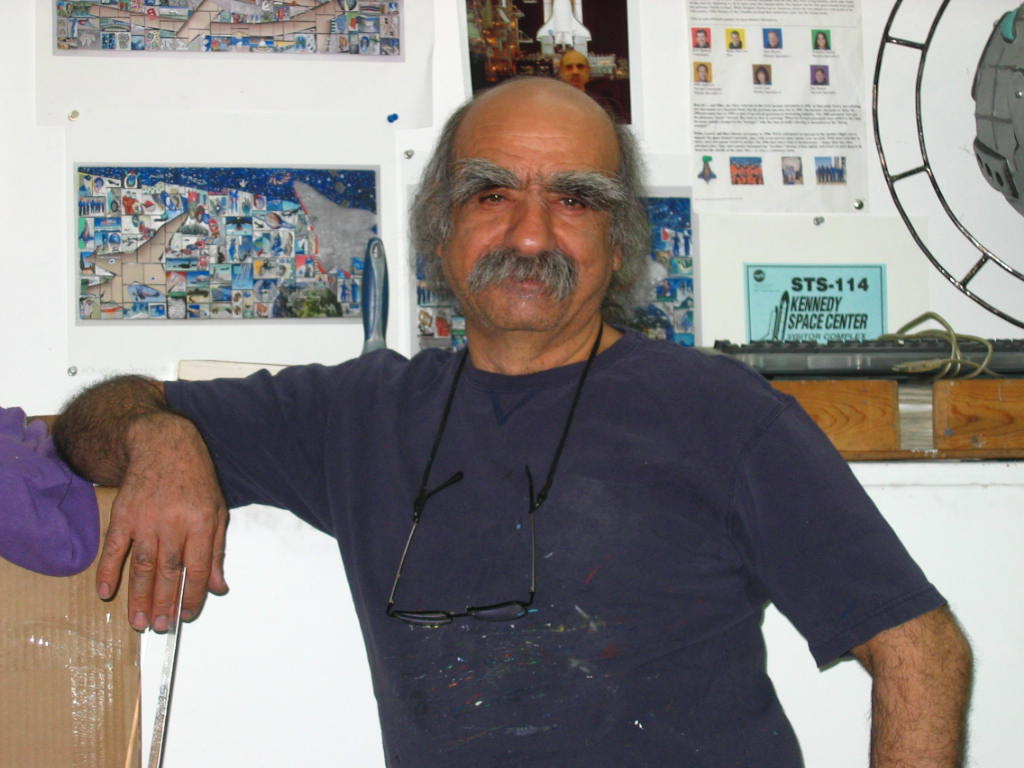
- Zigi Ben-Haim (2008)
- Born: 1945 (age 80–81); Baghdad, Iraq
- Education: M.F.A., San Francisco State University, San Francisco, California, USA, 1972-74. M.A., J.F.K. University, Orinda, California, USA, 1972-73. California College of Arts & Crafts, Oakland, California, USA, 1971. The Avni Institute of Fine Arts, Tel Aviv, Israel, 1966-70.
- Known for: Painter, Sculptor
- Awards: Pollock Krasner Foundation Grant, 1990, 1996, 2013.
- Website: zigiland.com

Zigi Ben-Haim (Hebrew: זיגי בן-חיים; born 1945 in Baghdad, Iraq) is an American-Israeli painter and sculptor who lives and works in New York City and Israel.

== Biography ==
Zigi Ben-Haim was born in Baghdad, Iraq, to an Iraqi Jewish family in 1945. When he was four, his family had to leave their home amid increasing danger for Jews in the country and flee to Iran. After about one year in Tehran, the family immigrated to the newly established state of Israel, where Ben-Haim grew up. After completing school and serving in the Israel Defense Forces for three years, he studied at the Avni Institute of Art and Design in Tel Aviv on a scholarship. With the Israeli economy in recession and not having financially well-off parents to depend on, Ben-Haim found it difficult to establish himself as an artist in Israel and decided to move abroad after receiving another scholarship. He applied to and was accepted at Goldsmiths art school in London, but captivated by the news from the United States about anti-Vietnam War protests, human rights demonstrations, hippies, and a thriving art world, decided at the last minute to move there instead.

Drawn by the hippie culture of California, Ben-Haim decided to move to the San Francisco Bay Area, settling in Berkeley. He studied at California College of the Arts and San Francisco State University, graduating with a Master of Fine Arts in 1974, and supported himself by working as a handyman, giving art classes, and taking a job at a warehouse in which he lived alongside other artists and musicians. He then began exhibiting his art and saving money in a safe deposit in a bank in Israel and considered whether to return to Israel or stay in the US. After his money in Israel was stolen in a bank robbery, he decided to stay in the US. He moved to New York City in 1975 and became a US citizen in 1979. The following year, he married Tsipi, a graduate student at New York University, and they have a son, Yori.

== Current Projects ==
=== Why Flowers? ===
"CoronaTime has accentuated our existence between life and death.

One object represents both ends.

Whether we’re going through bad times or good times we receive-Flowers!"

== Past projects ==
On August 9, 2017, Ben-Haim unveiled his sculpture, Treasure the Green, in SoHo on Broadway. The project was sponsored by the SoHo Broadway Initiative and the New York Department of Transportation's Art Program. The sculpture is considered to be the first sculpture to receive permission to be installed on a bus bulb on Broadway. The sculpture was made to "emphasize the importance of nature in our lives," and stands as a reminder of "the importance of reconnecting with the pure nature of the green." The sculpture uses the symbol of the leaf, which has been a major icon of Ben-Haim's work for the past 30 years. It symbolizes nature and it is a metaphoric way of emphasizing nature and the surrounding environment.

== Education ==
1972-74 M.F.A., San Francisco State University, San Francisco, California, USA.

1972-73 M.A., J.F.K. University, Orinda, California, USA.

1971 California College of Arts & Crafts, Oakland, California, USA.

1966-70 The Avni Institute of Fine Arts, Tel Aviv, Israel.

== Selected public collections ==
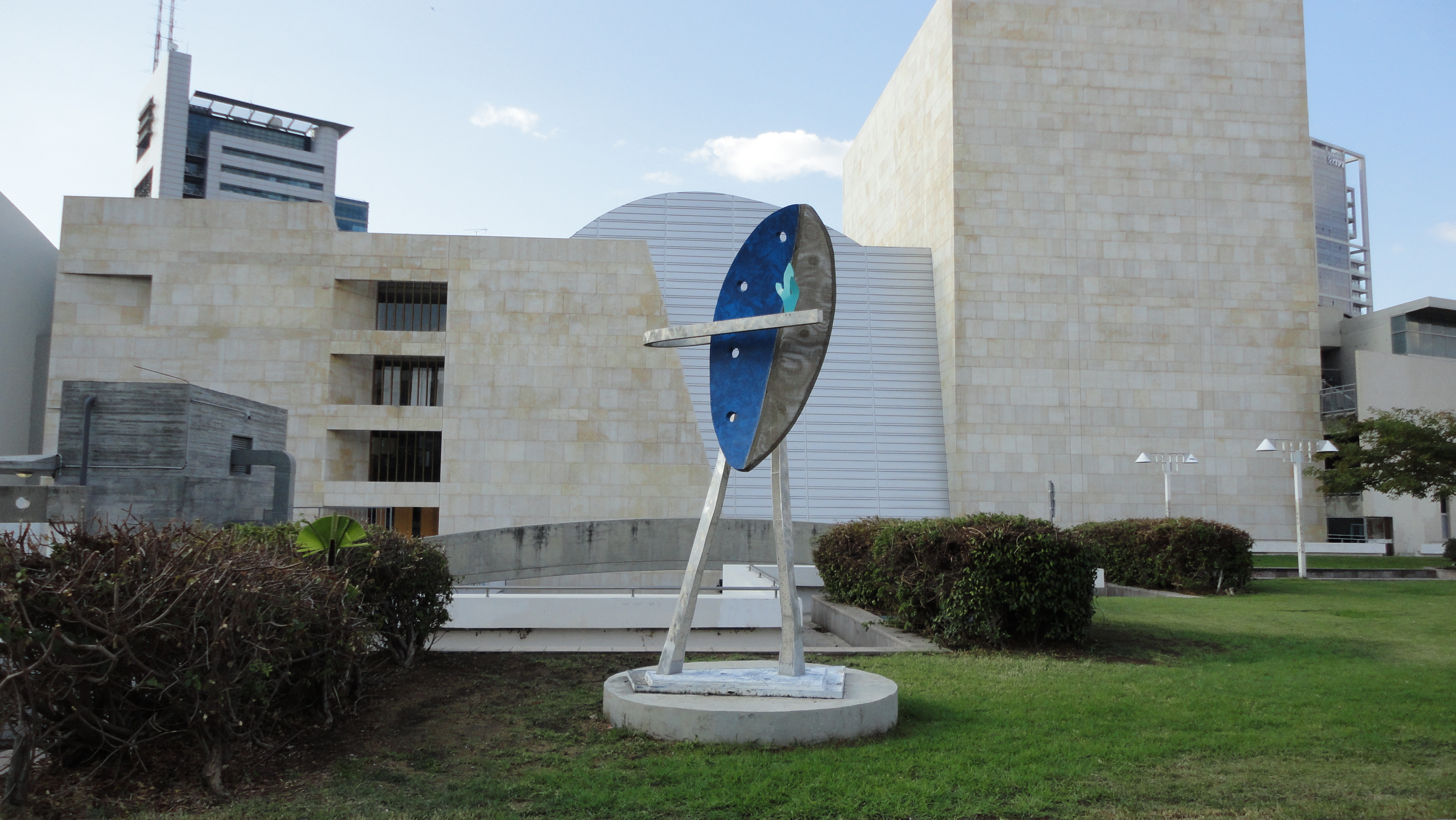
Splendid Step (2003) next to the Tel Aviv Museum of Art

- Museum of Contemporary Art, Athens, Greece
- Columbia Museum of Art, Columbia, SC
- Israel Air Force Center Foundation, Tel Aviv, Israel
- NASA, Houston, Texas
- Bank Leumi USA, Fifth Avenue, New York, NY
- Pfizer Company Collection, New York, NY
- Reading Public Museum, Reading, PA
- Guggenheim Museum, New York, NY
- Haifa Museum, Haifa, Israel
- Herbert F. Johnson Museum of Art, Cornell University, Ithaca, NY
- New School, New York, NY
- University of Maryland, College Park, Maryland.
- Israel Museum, Jerusalem, Israel.
- Brooklyn Museum, Brooklyn, NY
- Malmö Museum, Malmö, Sweden.
- Jewish Museum, New York, NY
- Tel Aviv Museum of Art, Tel Aviv, Israel.
- Museum of Fine Arts, Ghent, Ghent, Belgium.
- National Gallery of Art, Washington D.C.
- Fine Arts Museum of Long Island, Hempstead, NY
- Buscaglia-Castellanni, University Museum, Lewiston, NY
- Dan Eilat Hotel, Israel.
- International Paper Company, New York, NY
- World Bank, Washington D.C.
- Davis Polk & Wordwell, New York, NY
- Westminster Bank, New York, NY
- Israel Embassy, Washington D.C.
- Frederick R. Weisman, Los Angeles, CA.
- Rikers Hill Sculpture Park, Livingston, NJ
- Heckscher Museum of Art, Huntington, NY
- Allen Memorial Art Museum, Oberlin College, Oberlin, Ohio

== See also ==
- Israeli art
- Israeli sculpture
