= Frank Higham =

English footballer (1905–1975)

Personal information
- Full name: Frank Higham
- Date of birth: 8 July 1905
- Place of birth: Daventry, England
- Date of death: 1975 (aged 69–70)
- Position: Wing-half

Senior career*
Years	Team	Apps	(Gls)
1923–1924	Daventry Town		
1924–1925	Walsall	2	(0)
1926–1928	Wolverhampton Wanderers	37	(2)
1928–1930	Coventry City	35	(2)
1930–1931	Lincoln City	0	(0)
1931–1932	Worcester City		
1932–1933	Nuneaton Town		
1933–1934	Evesham Town		
1934	Hereford United		
Total		74	(4)
- * Club domestic league appearances and goals

Frank Higham (8 July 1905 – 1975) was an English footballer who played in the Football League for Coventry City, Walsall and Wolverhampton Wanderers.
