= Higham =

Higham may refer to:

== Places ==
- Higham, Derbyshire, England
- Higham, Kent, England
- Higham, Lancashire, England
- Higham, South Yorkshire, England
- Higham, Babergh, Suffolk, England
- Higham, West Suffolk, Suffolk, England
- Cold Higham, Northamptonshire, England
- Higham Ferrers, Northamptonshire, England
- Higham Gobion, Bedfordshire, England
- Higham on the Hill, Leicestershire, England
- Higham Wood, part of Tonbridge, Kent, England

== People ==
- Higham (surname)

== See also ==
- High Ham, a village and civil parish in Somerset, England
- Highams Park, a district in the London Borough of Waltham Forest, England.
