= Barry Hyam =

English cricketer

Barry Hyam (born 9 September 1975) is a former English cricketer, known for his role as a right-handed batsman and wicket-keeper. Throughout his nine-year first-class career, he played for Essex and Marylebone Cricket Club (MCC).

Hyam began his cricket career at a young age, joining the Essex Second XI at sixteen, where he competed in the Second XI Championship. He was promoted to Essex's first-class team in 1993. However, his progress was interrupted when he went nearly three years without playing a first-class match, and he did not feature in any games during the 1994 season.

== Career stats ==
Batting & Fielding

Format	Mat	Inns	NO	Runs	HS	Ave	100s	50s	Ct	St
FC	61	97	12	1409	63	16.57	0	3	168	13
List A	45	33	7	356	37	13.69	0	0	33	6

Bowling

Format	Mat	Balls	Runs	Wkts	BBI	BBM	Ave	Econ	SR	4w	5w	10w
FC	61	12	8	0	-	-	-	4.00	-	0	0	0
List A	45	0	0	0	-	-	-	-	-	0	0	0

After his final appearances for the Essex Second XI in 2003, Hyam retired from professional cricket.
