= Malmö Museum =

Swedish museum

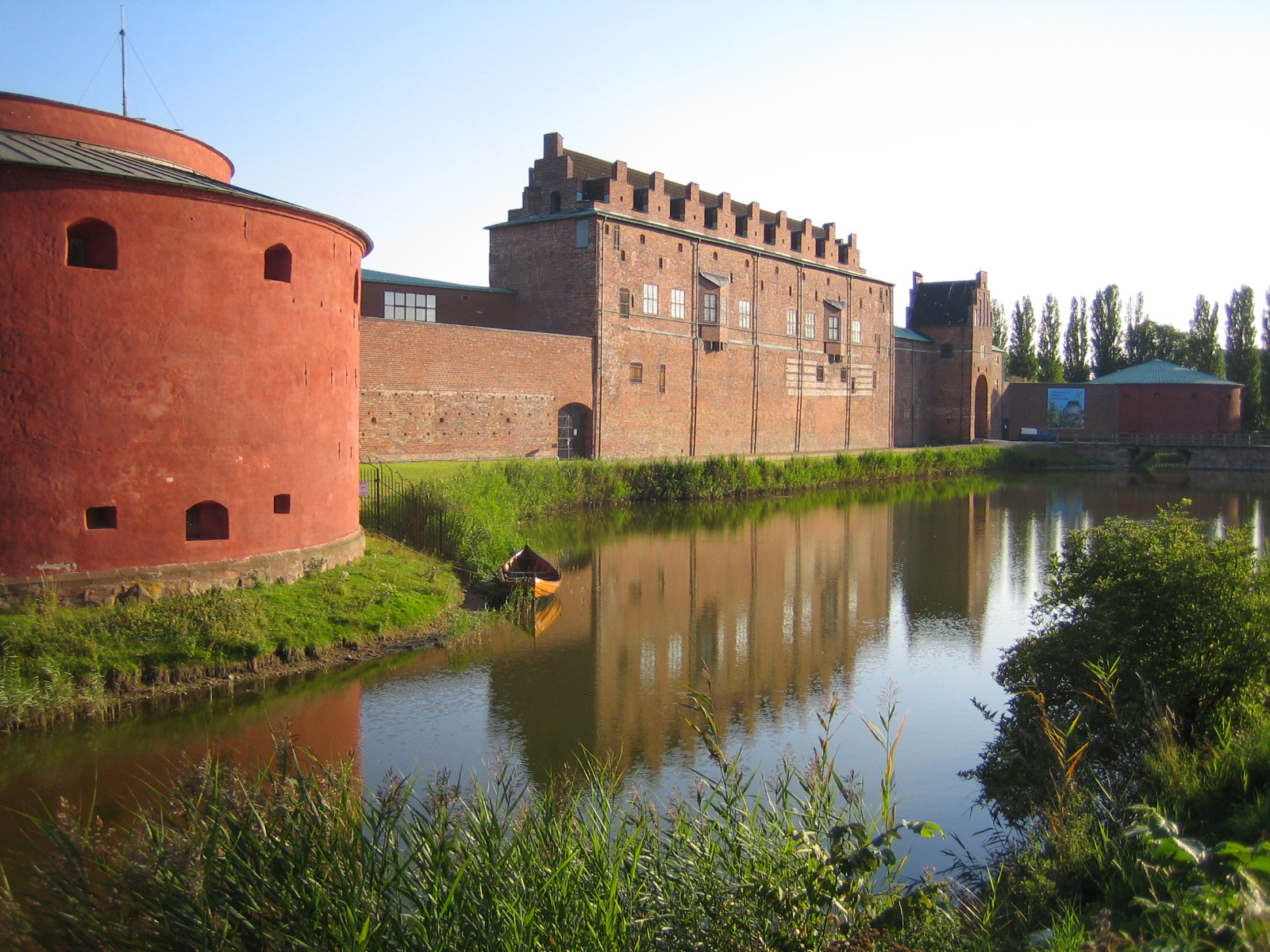
- Malmö Castle, housing the Malmö Art Museum and parts of the Malmö Museum.
- Interactive fullscreen map
- Established: 1841; 185 years ago
- Location: Malmöhusvägen 6, Malmö, Scania, Sweden
- Coordinates: 55°36′17″N 12°59′16″E
- Website: malmo.se/museer

Malmö Museum is a municipal and regional museum in Malmö, Sweden. The museum shows exhibitions on technology, shipping, natural history and history. Malmö museum also has an aquarium. The exhibitions are primarily shown on Castle Island (Slottsholmen) and in the Technology & Maritime Museum (Teknikens och sjöfartens hus). On Castle Island, Malmö Castle is part of the museum and Malmö Art Museum is also located there.

Malmö Museum is also a Science Center. Science Center Malmö includes the exhibitions Planet of Ideas, Vehicles of the Future, Muscles and Engines, Heaven and Earth, City of Time, Smart and Our Nature.

Malmö Museum is also responsible for archaeological and marine archaeological finds in Malmö on behalf of the county administrative board, and has a municipal mandate for cultural heritage protection. In 2002, the museum was awarded Museum of the Year by the Swedish Museums Association. Biljana Topalova-Casadiego has been the director of Malmö Museum since 2021.

On 22 April 2023, the Wisdome 360° Dome Cinema, donated by the Knut and Alice Wallenberg Foundation and others, was inaugurated in the partially rebuilt Technology & Maritime Museum. The theater and its surrounding spaces are part of a chain of similar facilities around Sweden, showing specially made films on the themes of space and scientific research and collaborating with various universities. Malmö Museum had 633,152 visitors in 2023, the fourth highest in the country, and is now Sweden's largest museum outside Stockholm.

== Collections ==
Malmö Museum's collections contain approximately 500,000 objects, 4 million photographs, 3-4 million archaeological artifacts and an archive collection. The main areas of the museum's collection include cultural history, natural history, archaeology, history of technology and maritime history. Some of the museum's objects are searchable in the Carlotta database.

== Exhibitions ==
The museum has several permanent basic exhibitions. On Castle Island there are the basic exhibitions Malmö Castle, Power over people, By order of the King, Our nature, The Aquarium, Welcome to Sweden, Color, form and function, Beachfronts and Scanian dinosaurs and other ancient animals and Clues - postholes, DNA and other traces from the past. There are also Malmö Museum's natural history dioramas depicting Swedish nature. They were built in the 1930s and 40s. In the main entrance on Slottsholmen, Malmö Museum's giraffe has been on display since 1937.

At the Technology & Maritime Museum, the basic exhibitions are the Submarine U3, The Boat Playroom, Without Land in Sight, Coastal Land, Muscles and Engines, The Planet of Ideas, Vehicles of the Future, Heaven and Earth, Impressions, Smart, The City of Time and Women Making History.

The museum also presents and produces temporary exhibitions. In 2024, the exhibition: Lars Wallin Fashion Stories. On display at the Technology & Maritime Museum until 12 January 2025.

=== Clues - postholes, DNA and other traces from the past ===
(Ledtrådar – stolphål, DNA och andra spår från forntiden) The exhibition is about the people who lived here long before us and the traces they left behind. From the oldest Stone Age 14 000 years ago, up to the end of the Iron Age about 1 000 years ago. Threads and parallels are drawn to our own time. The exhibition also shows how we think we know what we claim to know today about the past.

=== Power over people ===
(Makt över människor) The history of Malmö Castle from the 18th century to the present day is portrayed through the lives of people. The exhibition mainly highlights the period when the castle was used as a prison and the prisoners who were held at Malmöhus. The exhibition was opened in 2004.

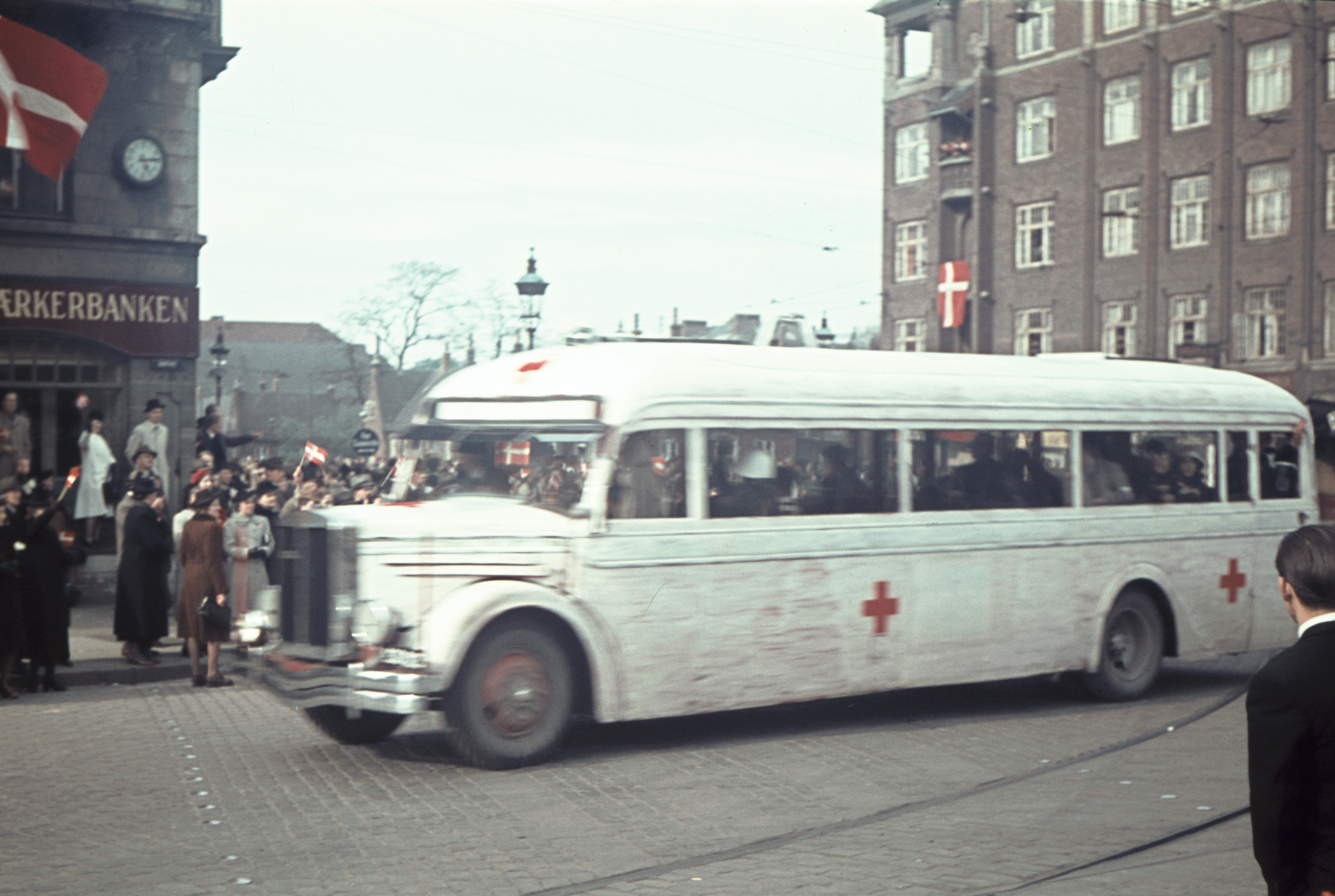
The White Buses operation. One of these buses is on display at Malmö Museum.

=== Welcome to Sweden ===
(Välkommen till Sverige) The exhibition is about the months in 1945 when Malmö Museum was transformed from a public museum into a refugee camp. Women and men from Nazi concentration camps came to Malmö through the Red Cross rescue operation, the White Buses. One of the few remaining White Buses is displayed outside Malmö Castle.

=== By order of the King ===
(På kungens order) By order of the King sheds light on the history of the 17th century Scanian War and how Scania became part of Sweden.

=== Our nature ===
(Vår natur) Our Nature is about nature and the animals closest to us, and about how humans use and affect nature both locally and globally. The exhibition shows parts of Malmö Museum's natural history collections.

=== The aquarium ===
(Akvariet) Malmö Museum's Aquarium was opened in 1937. In 2015, the aquarium was completely renovated and is now twice as big as before. The aquarium is divided into three sections: Our Waters, Unique and Endangered Environments, and Amazing Features of Animals. It houses a variety of animals and environments - from coral reefs to tropical rainforests and Swedish lakes. In total, there are 60 terrariums and aquariums.

=== Color Form Function ===
(Färg Form Funktion) Color, Form and Function is about the functions, colors and forms of nature and animals. It features stuffed animals from around the world. These include a Przewalski's horse, a proboscis monkey and a kiwi.

=== Scanian dinosaurs and other ancient animals ===
(Skånska dinosaurier och andra jättegamla djur) The exhibition takes you on a journey through time, with Scania at the center, from the early days of the Earth, 4.6 billion years ago, to the present day. The exhibition includes fossil finds from dinosaurs, prehistoric mammals and plants from Scania. Over the millions of years, the climate has changed several times and thus affected the conditions for life in Scania.

== Buildings ==
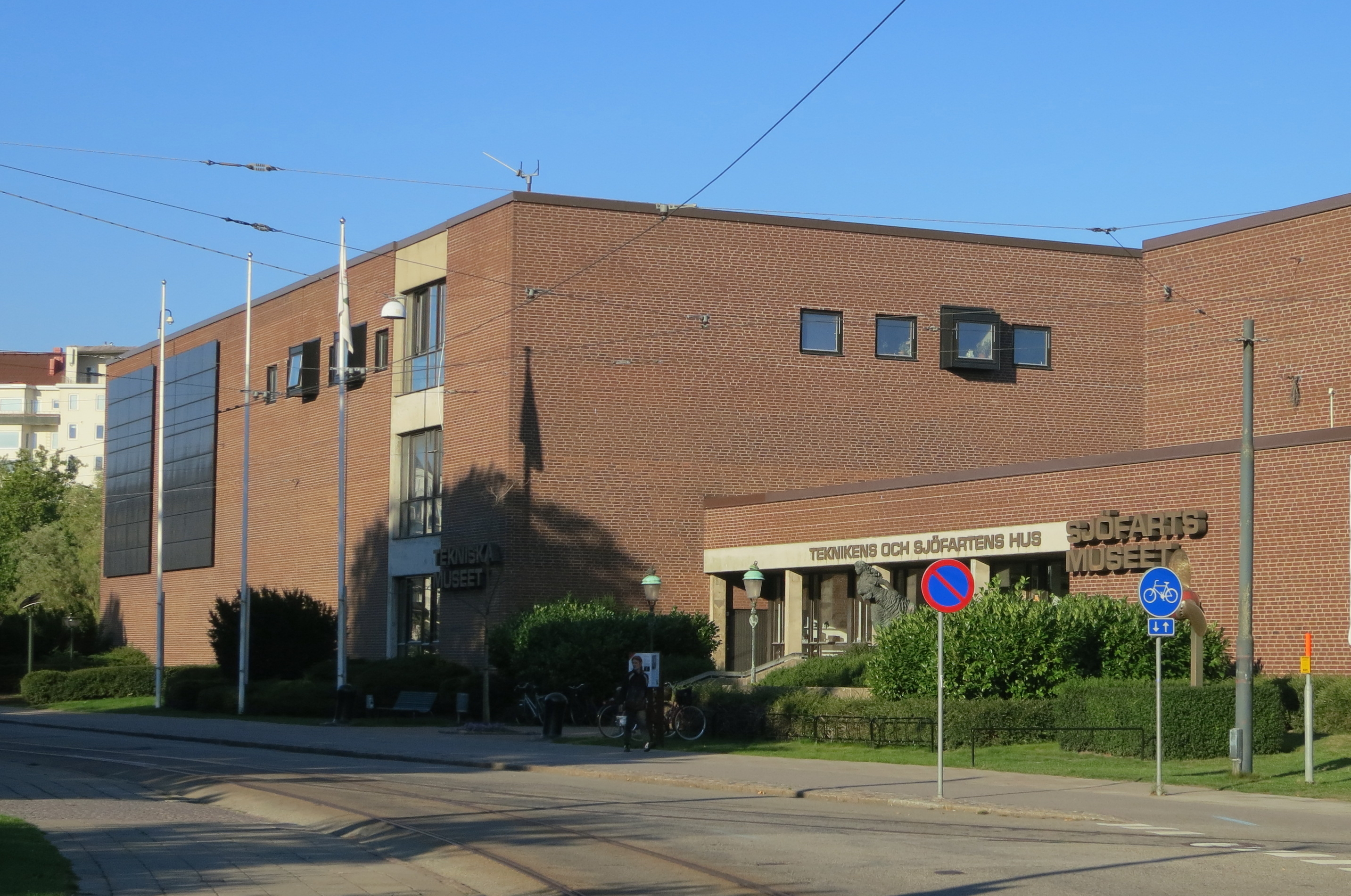
The Technology & Maritime Museum.

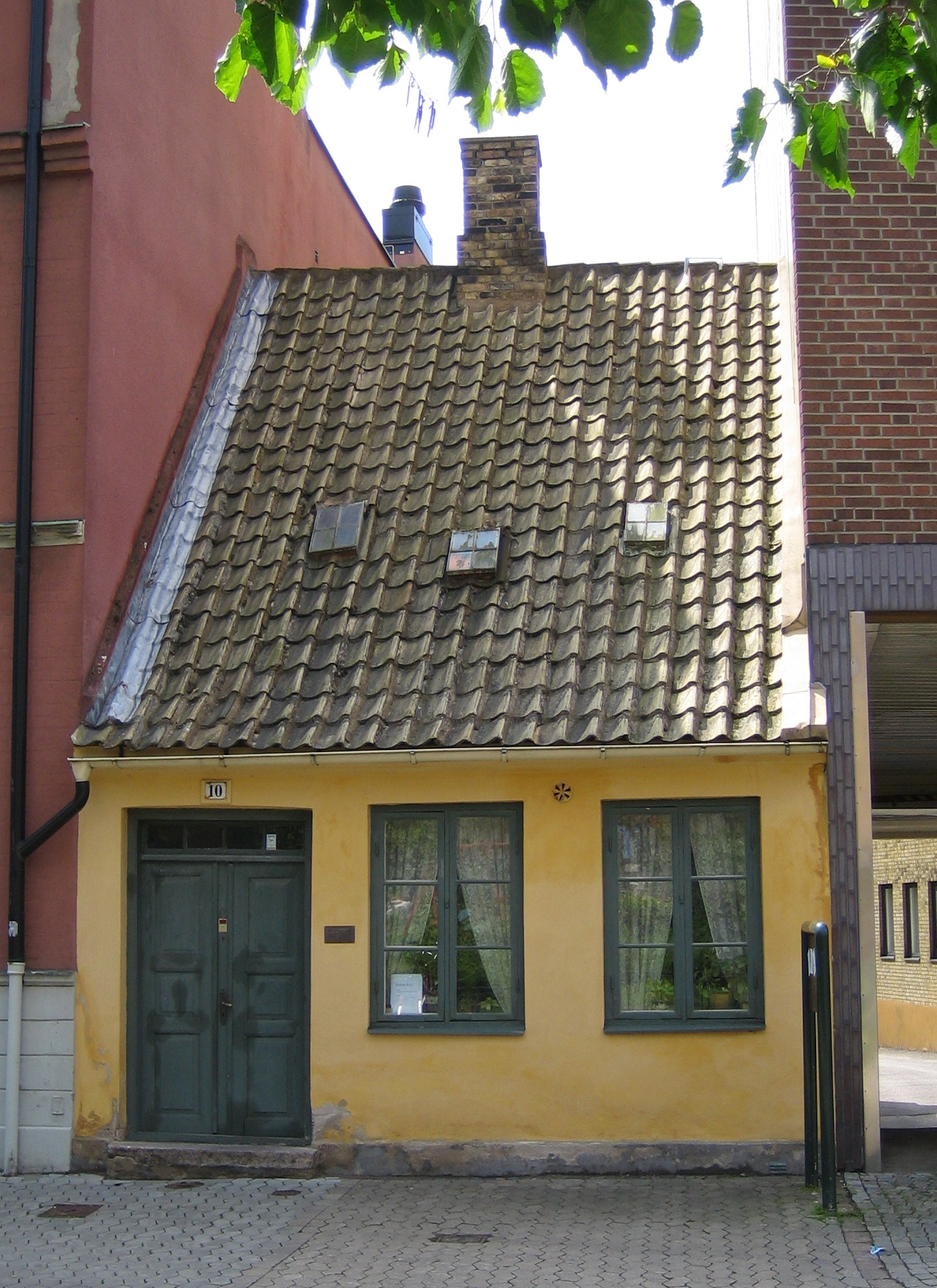
Ebba's House (Ebbas hus), a very small museum in Malmö.

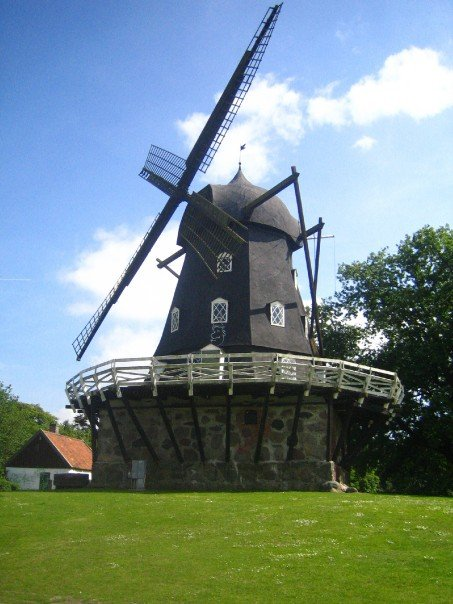
The Castle Mill.

The main exhibitions are displayed in the buildings:

- Malmö Castle at the Castle Island (Slottsholmen)
- Technology & Maritime Museum (Teknikens och sjöfartens hus)

Also included are buildings scattered around the city region (some temporarily closed or with other activities):

- The Commandant's House (Kommendanthuset)
- Ebba's House (Ebbas Hus)
- The Castle Mill (Slottsmöllan)

== History ==
The museum has its origins in the natural history collection created in 1841 by the curate P. Ax. Hultman in 1841 in Nya skolan, a private school established by Hultman. In 1851 the collection was taken over by the newly established Skånskt naturhistoriskt museum. In 1890, Malmö City Council decided to take over ownership of the museum and in 1901 a newly built museum was opened. Despite the large building, however, there was soon a shortage of space.

Malmö Castle had been used as a prison in the 19th century. When the new museum building from 1901 proved too cramped, thoughts turned to the old castle, which by then had become rather dilapidated. The castle was renovated in the 1920s and in 1932 a public architectural competition was held to determine how the castle could best be extended to accommodate a sufficiently large and modern museum. Construction of the winning proposal began in 1934 and was completed in 1937. With its new extension, Malmö Castle now also served as Malmö Museum.

At that time, there was a stated ambition to present the collections in a pedagogical way for popular education purposes, so that everyone would learn something new during their visit. Instead of, as before, lining up systematic series of museum objects, new research findings in pedagogy and psychology were used as a starting point. Exhibition texts were also to be presented in a user-friendly way so as to arouse the viewer's interest. The natural history section would not only display the biological specimens, but also describe the characteristics of the species and what "benefit or harm" it had for humans. Newspapers described the museum as "the most modern in Europe". When it opened, it already had an aquatic animal section and its own restaurant.

Between 1985 and 1999, the city of Malmö had a joint administration for a number of museums in and around Malmö, and from 1985 to 2023 these were brought together under the name Malmö Museum. The museums that were merged were the City Museum, the Technical and Maritime Museum, the Nature Museum, the Art Museum and the City Antiquities Department. The former museums became departments with their own managers under a common museum director. In 1999 the organization was changed again and now Malmö Art Museum and the City Antiquities Unit (Malmö Cultural Environment) became separate institutions. From July 1, 2008, Malmö Cultural Environment is again part of the Malmö Museum. Since April 2023, the name Malmö Museum is again the overall name for all activities.

== Technology & Maritime Museum ==
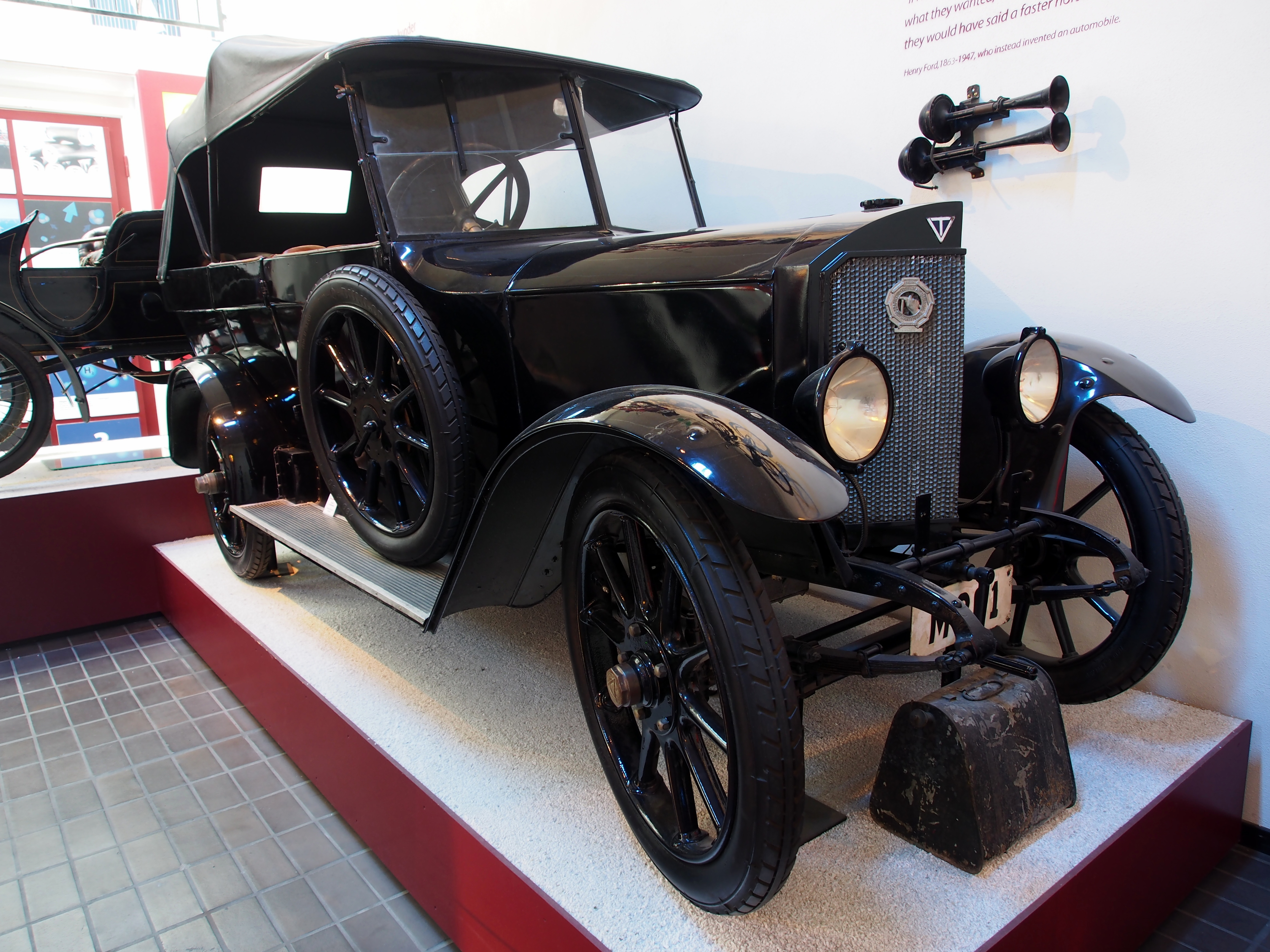
Thulin A, 1922.

Technology & Maritime Museum, formerly Malmö Museum of Technology, is one of the museums that are part of Malmö Museum.

The museum is located near Malmö Castle and shows, among many other things, machines and engines of various kinds. The development of aviation is documented and an experimental center is open to young and old. Adjacent to the museum is also the heritage tram, which is operated during the summer. Also on display at the museum are two fighter aircraft, the Saab 35 Draken and a Saab 37 Viggen, which made its last flight on 11 April 2000.

=== Submarine ===
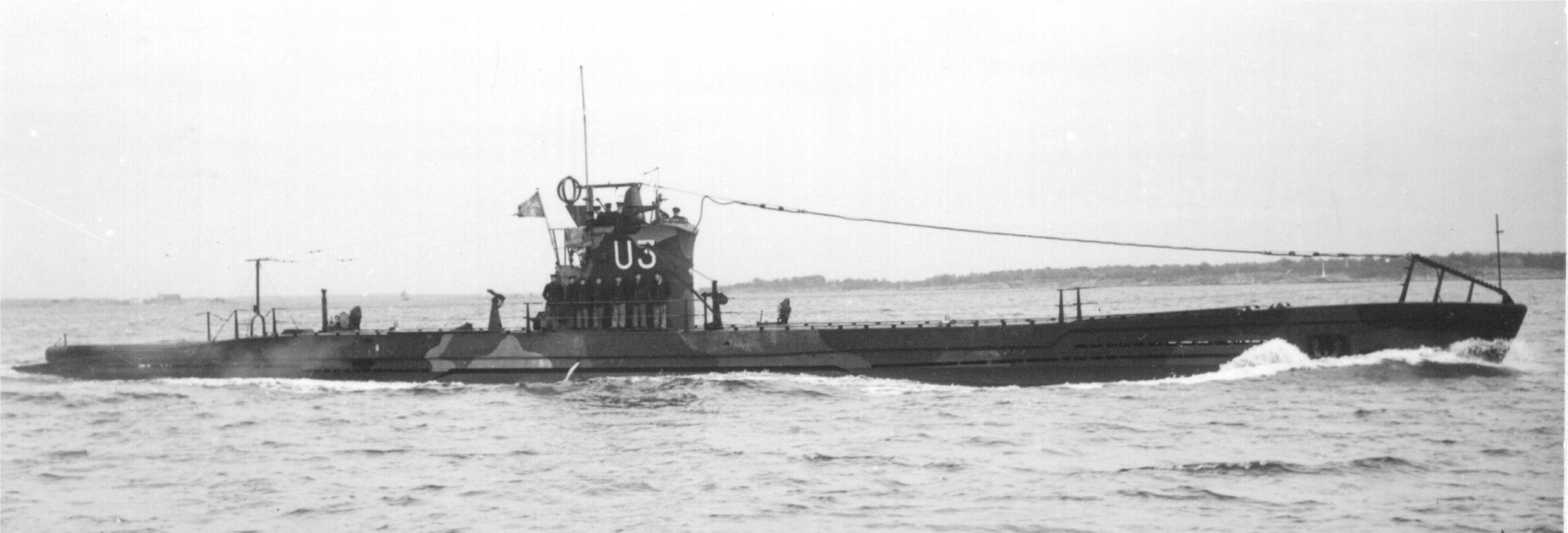
The HMS U3 circa 1945.

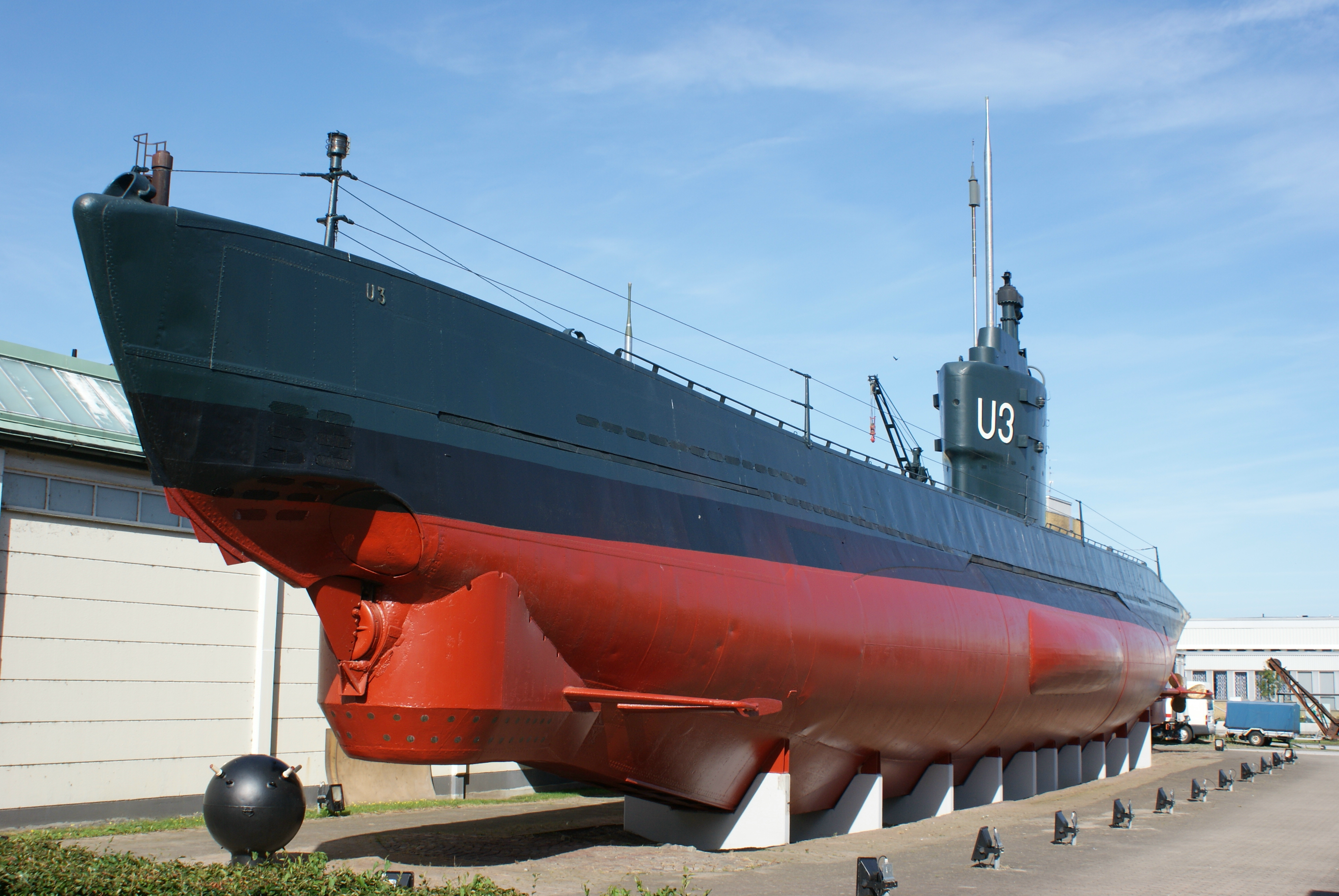
The HMS U3 at The Technology & Maritime Museum in 2009.

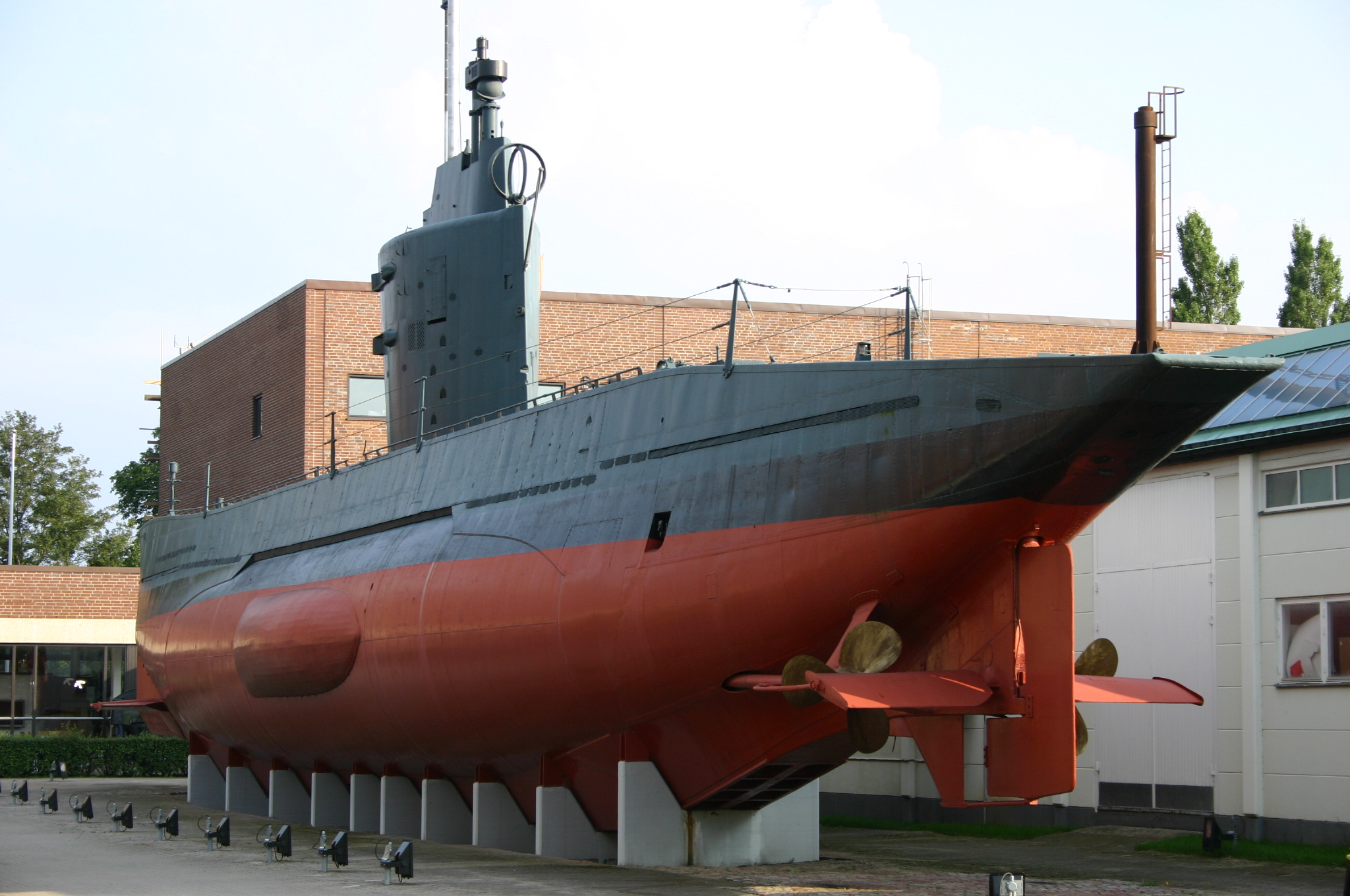
The HMS U3 at The Technology & Maritime Museum in 2004.

Visitors have the opportunity to board a real submarine. The museum includes the submarine HMS U3, which was in service between 1943 and 1964. The U3 veteran crew conducts popular tours and talks about life on board.

During the war, the U3 was largely used for training new crews for the 18 submarines delivered during the war.

After the war, the submarines were deposited with reduced crews, where one crew alternately operated 3-4 submarines. Technical experiences from the war and information from outside, mainly from Germany, inspired a modernization round for all Swedish submarines with sufficient remaining lifetime. Tests with snorkel, radar, radar detectors etc. were carried out.

The coastal submarines, or "The Number Boats" as the submariners called them, began to be rebuilt. The U3 was modernized at the Kockums shipyard in Malmö between August 1952 and April 1953. The U3 was fitted with a snorkel and a number of other improvements. Equipment that was removed was the aft deck torpedo tube, the anti-aircraft gun, the net saw and the turbo fan. A periscope was also taken ashore to make room for the snorkel. The shape of the turret became more hydrodynamically correct and the underwater speed increased from 7.5 knots to 9 knots. In 1954, U3 received a new hydrophone, torpedo guidance instruments and more modern radio equipment. After some time, the folding keel was removed and tests with automatic weight control and one-man steering equipment were carried out. Radar detectors were installed on the snorkel.

Six of the nine coastal submarines, U4-U9, were rebuilt in 1962-64 as Abborren II ("The Perch II") submarines, whereby the entire stern was replaced with a new one containing an electric motor for propulsion and a torpedo magazine for anti-submarine torpedoes in ballast tank three. All electronics were replaced. An advanced sonar system was installed, changing the shape of the bow. The shape of the turret was changed once again. Unfortunately, the modernizations did not mean an improved standard for the crew.

Today, the U3 is located at Technology & Maritime Museum in Malmö. Guides from the U3 Veteran Crew give popular tours and talk about life on board.

=== Heritage Tram ===
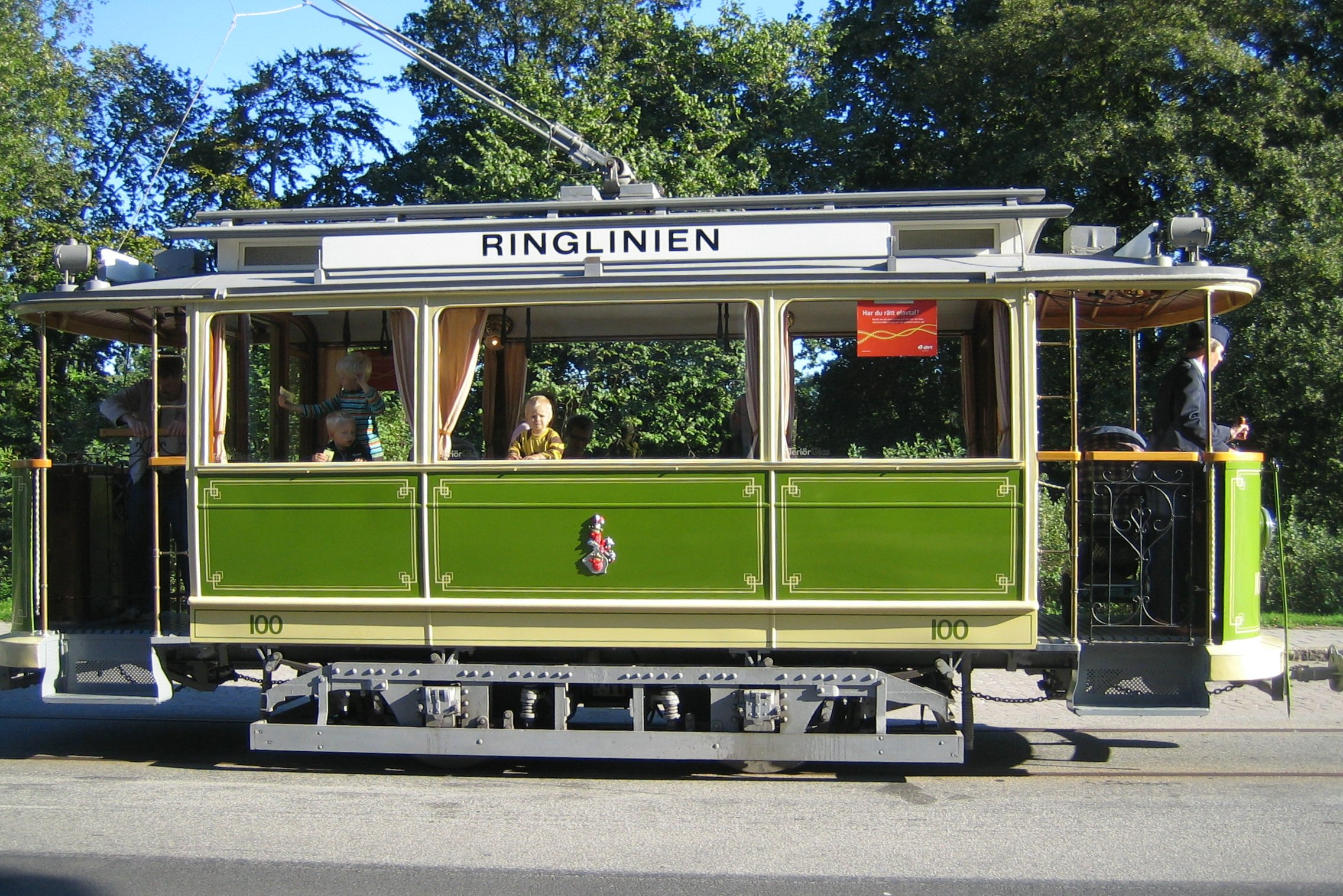
Heritage tram No 100 from 1905.

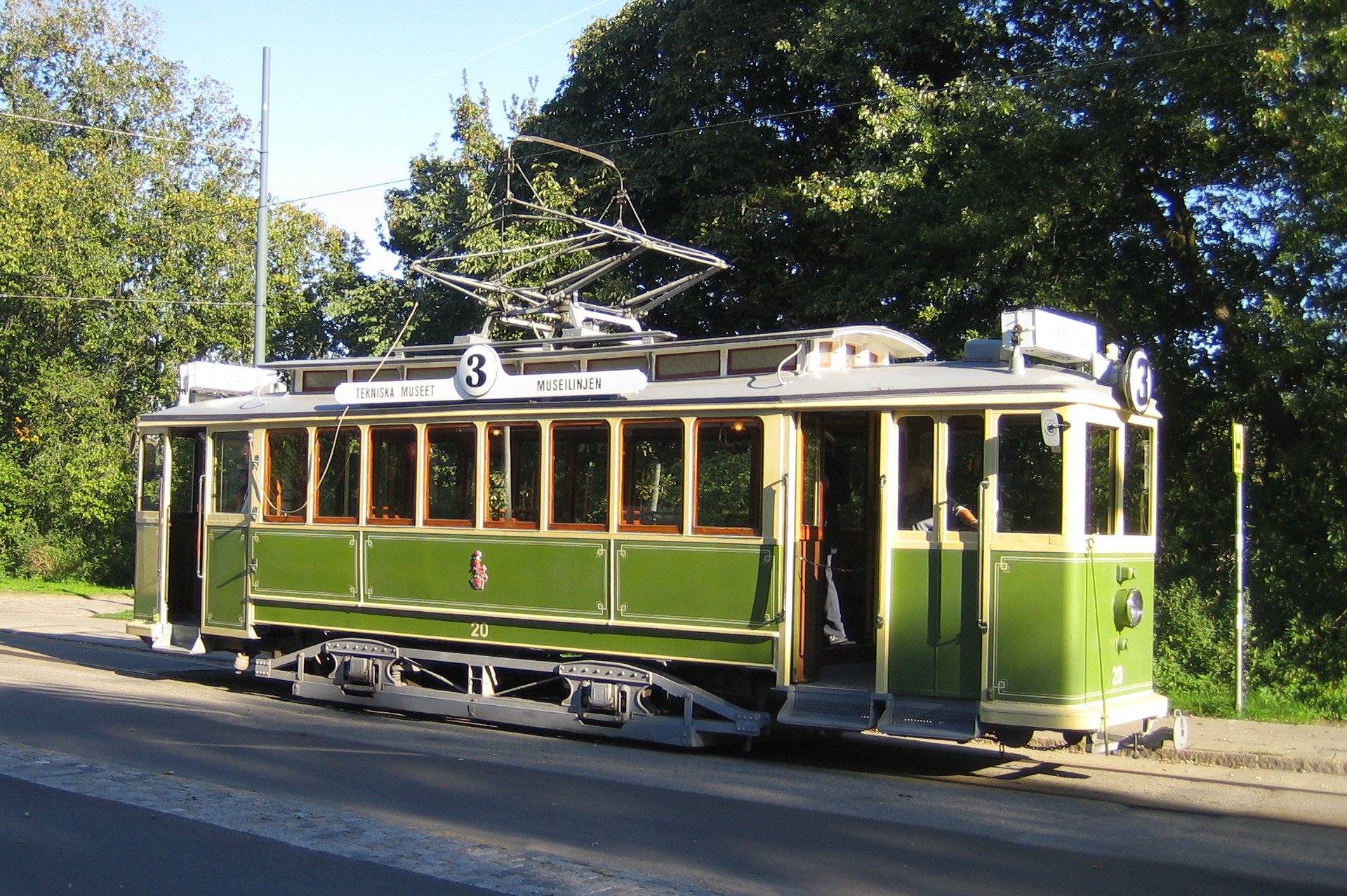
Heritage tram no. 20 from 1907, rebuilt in 1928.

The Malmö Heritage Tram (Museispårvägen Malmö) is a heritage tramway that runs between the City Library and Banérskajen, next to Malmö Castle. It was created in connection with Malmö Public Transport's (Malmö Lokaltrafik's) 100th anniversary in 1987.

The inauguration took place on 15 August 1987 with a single track from Banérskajen, along Malmöhusvägen past Malmö Castle to Bastion Carolus. The first year the line was operated by former tram drivers employed by Malmö Public Transport.

On 17 August 1991, an extension was inaugurated with a single track to the west along Malmöhusvägen past Turbinen and along Kung Oscars väg up to the City Library. Since then, the line has operated: Banérskajen - City Library - Bastion Carolus and back to Banérskajen. You can get on at all marked stops along the line. Further extension to a ring line up to Gustav Adolfs torg was planned for 1992 but has not yet been realized.

The traffic car was from 1987, MSS 20, a two-way car originally built by ASEA in Västerås in 1907. The wagon is basically restored to the design it got when rebuilt in 1928 with, among other things, longer platforms; however, some details are from the 1950s. MSS 20 was used in regular traffic until 1957.

Since 1998, MSS 100, a two-way car with open platforms, has also been in regular service. The wagon was built by Kockums Mekaniska Verkstad in Malmö in 1905. It was used as a plow and shunting wagon and then as a rail grinding and tool wagon until April 1973.

== Bibliography ==
- Anderberg, Ad. (1941). Malmö Museum 1841-1941. Malmö: AB Allhems Förlag.
- Rosborn, Sven (1977). Malmohus, Från 1400-talets kastell till 1900-talets museum (in Swedish). Malmö: En årsbok utgiven av Malmö museum.
