= Aaron ben Hayyim =

Aaron ben Hayyim was an exegete who lived in the first half of the nineteenth century at Grodno, Russia. He wrote Moreh Derek (He Who Shows the Way), tracing the exodus of the Israelites from Egypt, their wanderings in the desert, and the partition of Canaan among the Twelve Tribes. Appended to this work is a colored map of Palestine. The book was published at Grodno in 1836.
