= Roger Heigham =

16th-century English politician

Roger Heigham (by 1515 – 29 August 1558), also spelt Roger Higham, was an English politician and Tudor administrator. Roger was the second son of Robert Higham of Higham in Werneth, Cheshire. Robert, also spelt Robart, was descended from John Higham of Higham in Werneth who was listed in 1445 as a knight, gentleman and freeholder of Cheshire.

He was a member (MP) of the Parliament of England for Gatton in 1545. A Protestant reformer under Henry VIII of England he was responsible for the sale of many previously monastic buildings and estates. He is the grandfather of Saint Anne Line, a devout Catholic martyred in 1601.
