= Anne Line =

English Catholic martyr

Saint Anne Line
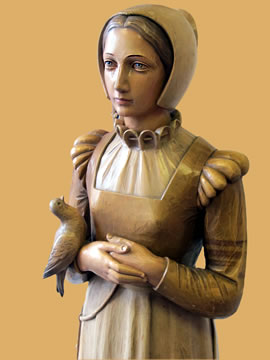
- Statue of St Anne Line at St Anne Line Junior School in Basildon, Essex, England, United Kingdom

Martyr
- Born: c. 1563; Essex, England
- Died: 27 February 1601 (aged 38 - 39); Tyburn, England
- Venerated in: Catholic Church; Anglican Communion
- Beatified: 15 December 1929 by Pope Pius XI
- Canonized: 25 October 1970 by Pope Paul VI
- Feast: 27 February (individual); 25 October (together with Forty Martyrs of England and Wales); 30 August (together with Saints Margaret Ward and Margaret Clitherow)
- Attributes: dove, noose in neck, book or bible,
- Patronage: childless people, converts, widows

Anne Line (c. 1563 – 27 February 1601) was an English Catholic martyr. After losing her husband, she became very active in sheltering clandestine Catholic priests, which was illegal in the reign of Queen Elizabeth I. Finally arrested, she was condemned to death and executed at Tyburn. The Catholic Church declared her a martyr, and Pope Paul VI canonised her in 1970.

== Biography ==
Anne is believed to have been born as "Alice Higham" or "Heigham", the eldest daughter of the Puritan William Higham of Jenkyn Maldon, Essex. William Higham was the son of Roger Heigham, MP, a Protestant reformer under Henry VIII. A recent (2016) scholarly and extensively annotated biography has been published by Roger Scully S.J. She was born circa the early 1560s, and at some time in the early 1580s converted to the Roman Catholic Church along with her brother William and Roger Line, the man she married in February 1583. Both Roger Line and William Higham were disinherited for converting to the Roman Catholic Church and Alice Higham lost her dowry. Among Catholics, the married "Alice" became known as "Anne", presumably a name she took at her conversion.

Roger Line and William Higham were arrested together while attending Mass, and were imprisoned and fined. While William Higham was released on surety in England, Roger Line was banished and went to Flanders. Line received a small allowance from the King of Spain, part of which he sent regularly to his wife until his death around 1594. Around the same time, John Gerard opened a house of refuge for hiding priests, and put the newly widowed Anne Line in charge of it, despite her chronic ill-health. For about three years Anne Line continued to run this house while Fr John Gerard was in prison. He was eventually transferred to the Tower of London where he was tortured, and from which he escaped. In his autobiography he writes:

After my escape from prison [Anne Line] gave up managing the house. By then she was known to so many people that it was unsafe for me to frequent any house she occupied. Instead she hired apartments in another building and continued to shelter priests there. One day, however (it was the Purification of Our Blessed Lady), she allowed in an unusually large number of Catholics to hear Mass … Some neighbours noticed the crowd and the constables were at the house at once.

=== Arrest and execution ===
Line was arrested on 2 February 1601 when her house was raided during the feast of the Purification, also known as Candlemas. On this day a blessing of candles traditionally takes place before the Mass, and it was during this rite that the raiders burst in and made arrests. The priest, Fr Francis Page, managed to slip into a special hiding place prepared by Anne Line and afterwards to escape, but she was arrested, along with another gentlewoman called Margaret Gage. Gage was released on bail and later pardoned, but Line was sent to Newgate Prison.

She was tried at the Sessions House on Old Bailey Lane on 26 February 1601 and was so weak from fever that she was carried to the trial in a chair. She told the court that, so far from regretting having concealed a priest, she only grieved that she "could not receive a thousand more." Sir John Popham, the judge, sentenced her to death for the felony of assisting a seminary priest.

Line was hanged on 27 February 1601. She was executed immediately before two priests, Roger Filcock and Mark Barkworth, who received the more severe sentence of hanging, drawing and quartering. At the scaffold she repeated what she had said at her trial, declaring loudly to the bystanders: "I am sentenced to die for harbouring a Catholic priest, and so far I am from repenting for having so done, that I wish, with all my soul, that where I have entertained one, I could have entertained a thousand."

== Possible Shakespeare allusions ==
It has been argued that Shakespeare's poem The Phoenix and the Turtle was written shortly after her death to commemorate Anne and Roger Line, and its setting is the Catholic requiem held in secret for her. This theory was first suggested in the 1930s by Clara Longworth de Chambrun in her novel My Shakespeare, Rise!, and is linked to claims that Shakespeare was a secret Catholic sympathiser. The theory was revived and developed by John Finnis and Patrick Martin in 2003. It has been extended by Martin Dodwell to suggest that Shakespeare takes the fate of Anne and Roger Line to symbolize the rejection of Catholicism by England, and he then returns to this allegorical scheme in the play Cymbeline.

A series of other Shakespearean allusions to Anne Line have been proposed by various scholars (Colin Wilson, Gerard Kilroy) most notably in The Tempest and in Sonnet 74.

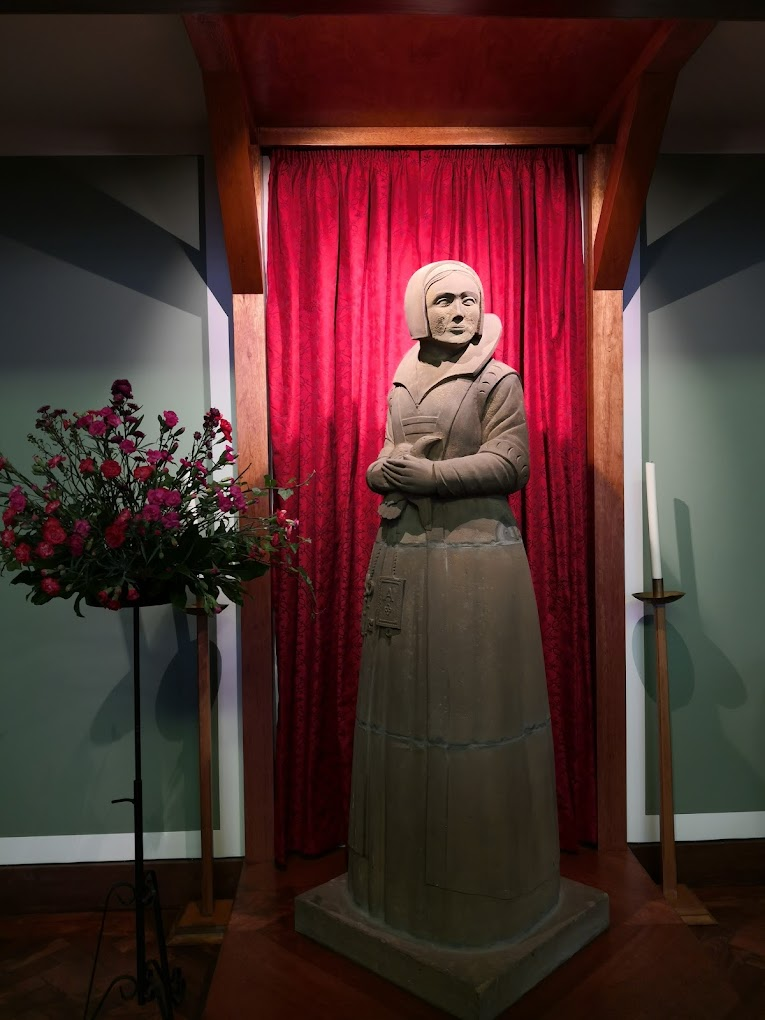
Statue of Saint Anne Line in the parish church named after her in South Woodford, Essex.

== Veneration ==
Anne Line was beatified by Pope Pius XI on 15 December 1929. She was canonised by Pope Paul VI on 25 October 1970, as one of the Forty Martyrs of England and Wales. Her feast day, along with all the other English Martyrs, is on 4 May. However, in the Catholic dioceses of England, she shares a feast day with fellow female martyr saints, Margaret Clitherow and Margaret Ward on 30 August. The three were officially added to the Episcopal Church liturgical calendar with a feast day on 30 August.

The St. Anne Line Catholic Junior School in Wickhay, Basildon, Essex, is named for her. So is the Catholic parish of St Anne Line, Great Dunmow, Essex, where local tradition has it that her family lived in the Clock House, Great Dunmow. Additionally, the Catholic parish of St Anne Line in South Woodford, London, also is named after the saint and possess a large stone carved statue of her inside the church.

== See also ==
- List of Catholic martyrs of the English Reformation
