= Tom Higham =

Tom or Thomas Higham may refer to:

- Tom Higham, player for the Sydney Roosters in 1966
- Tom Higham, half of Aquilo, UK music duo
- Tom Higham, designer of Triumph Bonneville T140D Special motorbike
- Thomas Higham (archaeologist), New Zealand archaeologist
- Thomas Higham, 18th-century squire of Cold Higham, Northamptonshire, England
