= Hammond (surname) =

The English surname or family name Hammond is derived from one of several personal names, most frequently

- the Norman Hamo/Hamon, a shortened form of one of several names beginning with haim, meaning "home"
- the Old Norse Hámundr, composed of Há (high) + Mund (protection)

Some notable people with the surname Hammond include:

== People surnamed Hammond ==
=== North and South America ===
- A. B. Hammond (1848–1934), American lumberman
- Abram A. Hammond (1814–1874), American politician
- Albert Hammond, Jr. (born 1980), American musician
- Albert Hammond (Wisconsin politician) (1883–1968), American politician
- Andrew Hammond (born 1988), Canadian hockey player
- Ben Hammond (born 1977), American Sculptor
- Beres Hammond (born 1955), Jamaican singer
- Chauncey B. Hammond (1882–1952), New York politician
- Chris Hammond (born 1966), American baseball player
- Darrell Hammond (born 1955), American comedian
- Darryl Hammond (born 1967), American football player
- David Hammond (born 1948), American director
- David Hammond (1882–1940), American swimmer
- Doug Hammond (born 1942), American drummer
- Earl Hammond (1921–2002), American actor
- Eli Hammond (1764–1842), American settler and plantation owner
- Eli Shelby Hammond (1838–1904), American judge
- Evan Hammond (born 1987), American Landscape Architect
- Fred Hammond (born 1960), American singer
- Fred W. Hammond (1872–1942), New York politician
- Garrett Hammond, the drummer of the alternative rock bands Kill Hannah and Prick
- George Hammond (1903–1981), American race car driver
- George S. Hammond (1921–2005), American chemist
- George P. Hammond (1896–1993), American librarian and professor of Latin American studies
- Gerrie Hammond (died 1992), Canadian politician
- Graeme Hammond (1858–1944), American neurologist and fencer
- James B. Hammond (1839–1913), American inventor
- James Henry Hammond (1807–1864), American politician
- Jason E. Hammond (1862–1957), American educator and politician
- Jay Hammond (1922–2005), American politician
- Joe Hammond (1902–1990), Australian footballer
- Joe Hammond (basketball), American basketball player
- John Hays Hammond (1855–1936), American mining engineer and philanthropist
- John Hays Hammond, Jr. (1888–1965), American radio engineer
- John Henry Hammond (1910–1987), American record producer, talent scout, civil rights activist, and music critic
- John P. Hammond (1942–2026), American blues singer and guitarist
- Jonathan Hammond, filmmaker
- Josh Hammond (born 1998), American football player
- Jupiter Hammon (1711–1806), African-American poet
- Kim Hammond (1944–2017), American football player and jurist
- L. Blaine Hammond (born 1952), American astronaut
- Laurens Hammond (1895–1973), American engineer and inventor
- Leonard Coombes Hammond (1884–1945), American aviator
- Marlene Hammond, All-American Girls Professional Baseball League player
- Matthew B. Hammond (1868–1933), American economist
- Melvin Ormond Hammond (1876–1934), Canadian journalist, writer, and photographer
- Michael P. Hammond (ca. 1932–2002), American composer
- Nicholas Hammond (born 1950), American actor
- Peter Hammond (1797–1870), Swedish immigrant, founder and namesake of Hammond, Louisiana
- Raymond P. Hammond (born 1964), American poet, critic and editor
- Samuel Hammond (1757–1842), US Congressman from Georgia
- Samuel H. Hammond (1809–1878), New York politician
- Stephen H. Hammond (1828–1910), New York politician
- Thomas Hammond (1843–1909), Indiana politician
- Thomas Hammond (1790–1874), Maryland politician
- Thomas Taylor Hammond (1920–1993), American historian and photographer
- Tom Hammond (born 1944), American journalist
- Wayne G. Hammond (born 1953), J. R. R. Tolkien scholar
- William Alexander Hammond (1828–1900), American soldier and physician
- Winfield Scott Hammond (1863–1915), American politician

=== Oceania ===
- Bill Hammond (1947–2021), New Zealand artist
- Bob Hammond (1942–2020), Australian football player
- Fiona Hammond (born 1983), Australian water polo player
- Fran Hammond, Australian basketball player
- Jill Hammond (born 1950), Australian basketball player and captain
- Joan Hammond (1912–1996), New Zealand born Australian singer
- Wayne Hammond (field hockey) (born 1948), Australian field hockey player
- Simon Hammond (born 1962), Australian author and entrepreneur
- Stan Hammond (1942–2010), Australian water polo player
- Stanley James Hammond (1913–2000), Australian sculptor

=== Europe ===
- Albert Hammond (born 1944), British singer and songwriter
- Albert Hammond (1924–1989), English footballer
- Aleqa Hammond (born 1965), Greenland prime minister
- Alison Hammond (born 1975), British contestant and journalist
- Arthur George Hammond (1843–1919), British soldier
- Dean Hammond (born 1983), British soccer player
- David Hammond (born 1995), Irish presenter
- David Hammond (1928-2008), Northern Ireland broadcaster
- Elvis Hammond (born 1980), Ghanaian-born British football player
- George Hammond (1763–1853), British diplomat
- George Hammond (born 2000), English rugby union player
- Harry Hammond (1868–1921), British football player
- Henry Hammond (1605–1660), English religious leader
- Hermione Hammond (1910–2005), British painter
- James Hammond, eighteenth century British poet
- Jeffrey Hammond (born 1946), British musician
- John Lawrence Hammond (1872–1949), British journalist and writer
- Jonathan Hammond (1891–1980), English football player
- Matthew Hammond (died 1579), British plough-wright, Unitarian
- Nicholas G. L. Hammond (1907–2001), British historian
- Nick Hammond (born 1967), British football player and manager
- Nicolas Hammond (born 1964), British author
- Norman Hammond (born 1944) is a British archaeologist (most noted as a Maya specialist)
- Peter Hammond (1923–2011), English actor
- Peter Hammond (1921–1999), English priest
- Peter J. Hammond (fl. 1980s), British television writer
- Peter J. Hammond (born 1945), British economist
- Phil Hammond (born c. 1962), British comedian and journalist
- Philip Hammond (born 1955), British politician
- Reginald Hammond (1909–1991), English cricketer and Royal Navy officer
- Richard Hammond (born 1969), British journalist
- Roger Hammond (born 1974), British cyclist
- Sara Hammond (1672–1716), Norwegian landowner and businesswoman
- Sydney Hammond (1882–1917), English footballer
- T. C. Hammond (1877–1961), Irish-born religious leader
- Thomas Hammond (1878–1945), English athlete
- Thomas Hammond (1630–1681), English-Norwegian merchant
- Thomas Hammond (c. 1600–1658), English army officer
- Wally Hammond (1903–1965), British cricketer

=== Africa ===
- George Hammond (born 1976), South African cricketer
- Laatekwei Hammond (born 1980), Ghanaian boxer

== Fictional characters ==
- Jim Hammond, the original Human Torch.
- Ashley Hammond, a character in the Power Rangers television series
- Evey Hammond, the protagonist in both the 1980s graphic novel series and the 2006 film adaptation V for Vendetta, played in the film by Natalie Portman
- Kim Hammond, a character in the 1980 slasher film Prom Night played by Jamie Lee Curtis.
- Sheila and Joel Hammond, played by Drew Barrymore and Timothy Olyphant, are the main characters in the Netflix original horror comedy show Santa Clarita Diet.
- Major General (later Lieutenant General) George Hammond, the head of Stargate Command in the sci-fi television show Stargate SG-1
- Hector Hammond, a DC Universe supervillain, primarily an enemy of Green Lantern
- Madeline Hammond, a character in the Light of the Western Stars series by Zane Grey
- Mark Hammond, the main character of The Getaway (video game)
- John Hammond, a fictional millionaire, head of In-Gen and the creator of Jurassic Park
- Reggie Hammond, protagonist played by Eddie Murphy in the movie 48 Hrs.
- Zach Hammond, chief security officer of the USG Kellion in Dead Space
- Lisa Hammond, a character played by Jobeth Williams in the movie Teachers with Nick Nolte
- The Hammond Family, in the TV Show Political Animals with Sigourney Weaver
- Hammond, a hamster and the real name of Wrecking Ball in the video game Overwatch.

== See also ==
- Hammonds (surname)
