= Arlington, Devon =

Village and civil parish in north Devon, England

Coordinates: 51°08′54″N 3°58′55″W

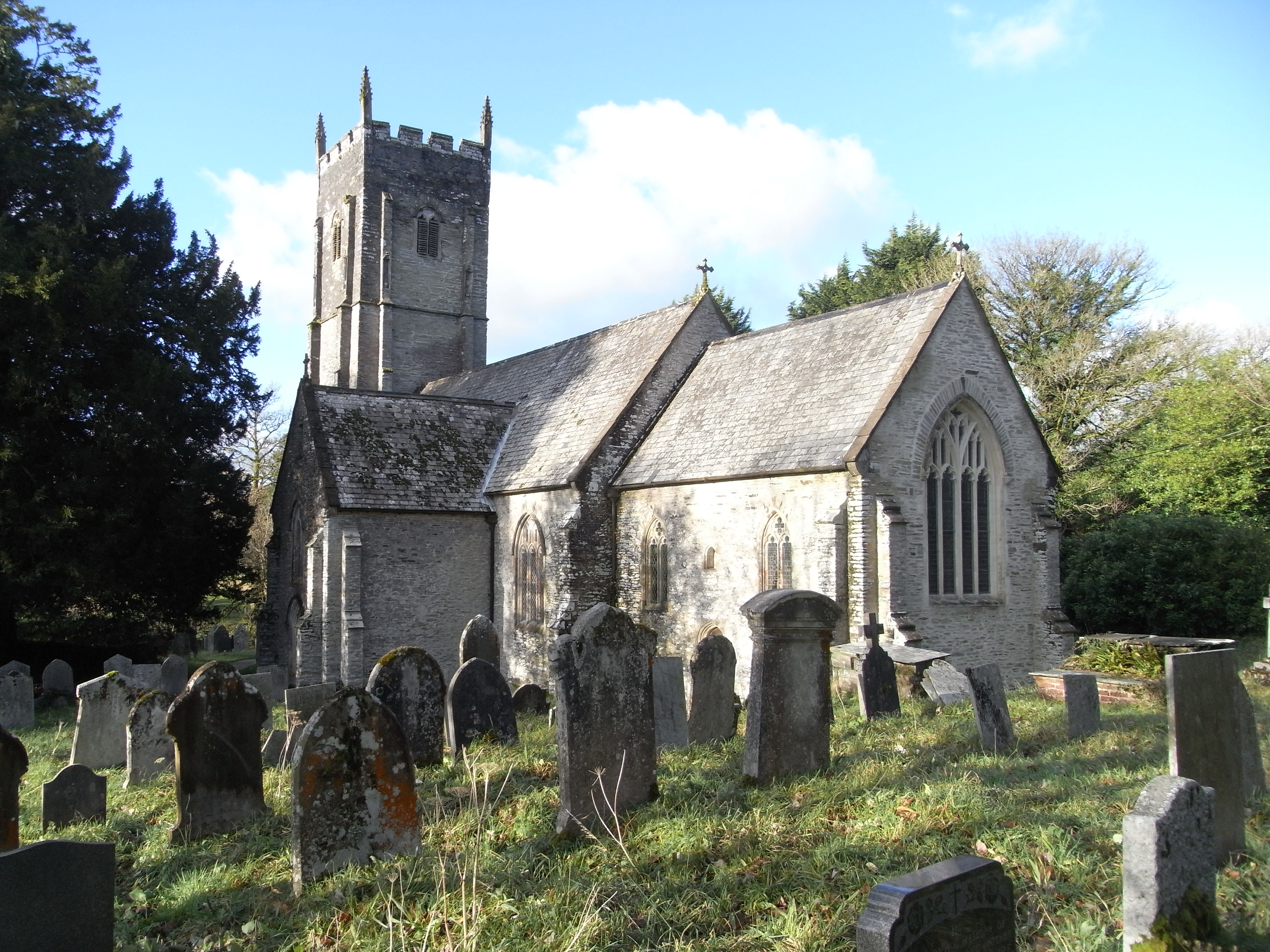
St James's Church, Arlington, Devon, viewed from SE

Arlington was a manor, and is a village and civil parish in the North Devon district of Devon in England. The parish includes the villages of Arlington and Arlington Beccott. The population of the parish is 98 (2001 census).

Arlington Court, long owned by the Chichester family, lords of the manor since the 14th century, is now owned by the National Trust and home to the Trust's collection of over 50 historic horse-drawn carriages.

Victoria Cross holder Sir Mark Walker lived in Arlington, dying there in 1902.

== Descent of the manor ==
Arms of Chichester: Chequy or and gules, a chief vair

The manor of "Alferdintone" (Arlington) was listed in the Exeter Domesday Book of 1086 as held by "Alvred de Ispania" (Alfred of Spain) as a tenant-in-chief of the king. The estate of Twitchen, now a farm within Arlington parish, was stated to have been added to the manor of Arlington. Alfred also held Orway, and held no other lands in Devon. It later was acquired by the de Raleigh family, lords of the manor of Raleigh in the parish of Pilton. For the descent of the lands of the de Raleigh family to the Chichester family see Raleigh.

== Grant to Amias Chichester ==
Sir John Chichester (c. 1474 – 1537) of Raleigh, the son and heir of Nicholas Chichester (d.pre-1496) and heir to his grandfather, married firstly in about 1490, Margaret Beaumont (died 1507), daughter and co-heiress of Hugh Beaumont of Shirwell by his wife Thomasine Wise, and the heir to Raleigh and the other principal family estates was Sir John Chichester (c. 1516/22-1569), (grandson), son of Edward Chichester (c. 1496 – 1522), (second and eldest surviving son of Sir John Chichester (c. 1474 – 1537). However Sir John Chichester (c. 1474 – 1537) married secondly to Joan Brett, sister of Robert Brett (died 1540), lord of the manor of Pilland in the parish of Pilton, and the last steward of Pilton Priory before its dissolution and widow of John Courtenay (died 1510) of Molland; she survived her husband and remarried Henry Fortescue. His will was witnessed by his brother-in-law Robert Brett (died 1540). His eldest son by his second wife Joan Brett was Amyas Chichester (1527–1577), to whom he granted his manor of Arlington, and who established that line of the family, created Chichester Baronets of Arlington Court in 1840. The Latin deed dated 28 November 1535 making the grant survives in the Chichester of Arlington archives in the North Devon Record Office, catalogued as follows: "Surrender John Chechester, and Joan, his wife to Amias Chechester, their son, Manor of Alryngton, alias Arlyngton, with advowson of the church; 2 red seals of John and Joan Chechester on parchment tags". His will dated 12 October 1530, written five years before he made the grant sets out his intentions clearly: "Will (indented) of John Chechester, Esq. Manors, lands, advowsons of churches, etc. of and in Dunwere, Beggernhuysche alias Huyshe Gaunte, Arlyngton, Rokesford [in Sandford?], Cheryton Fytz Payne, Tregamere, and Treverbyan, to Johan his wife for her life. After her death, manor and advowson of Arlington to his son Amys and his heirs male and manor of Dunwere to his son John, and his heirs male. Manor of Ralegh [in Pilton] and advowson of chantry there, and moiety of manor of Awton Gifford to go after death of Elizabeth, late wife of Hewe Chechester, to Johan (i.e. Brett), and after her death to go, together with the manor of Wedisworthy after the death of his mother, to his executors, for the performance of various provisions in his Will concerning marriage of his daughters, maintenance of his children, compensation of tenants, etc. Manors, lands, advowsons of churches, etc. of and in Maneton Magna, Huntor [in Manaton?], Hennok, Lokesforde [Loxhore], Barstabell, Scherwell, Pilton, Kentisbury and Tauton Bischopp, to his son William and his heirs male, if he refuse to be a priest. Executors: Johan his wife, and Amys his son. Overseers: Robert Brett, Richard Chechester, John Forde". Amias married Jane Giffard, daughter of Sir Roger Giffard (died 1547) of Brightley in the parish of Chittlehampton. The Heralds' Visitation of Devon lists 19 children produced from this marriage. The descent from Amias is as follows:

- Henry Chichester (eldest son) (1545–1589), married in 1571/2 Mary Burgoine (died 1616), daughter of George Burgoine of South Zeal, immediately north of Dartmoor, which family Lysons (1822) states to have also held the nearby manor of South Tawton: "A younger branch of the Bedfordshire family of that name, continued (in Devon) for several generations, having married the heiresses of Sheldon, Stoning, and Courtenay. The heiress of the Burgoynes married Jackson, of Exeter. William Courtenay Burgoyne, Esq., died in 1750. Arms: Azure, a talbot passant argent on a mullet or a crescent sable for difference". A monument to Robert Burgoyne dated 1651 exists in the church at South Tawton and shows the arms of a talbot dog. Their 14th-century manor house at nearby South Zeal is now the "Oxenham Arms" public house. The arms of Burgoyne can also be seen on the monument to Thomas Chafe (1585–1648) of Dodscott, in the parish church of St Giles in the Wood.
- Amias Chichester (1574-1621/2) (son), married Susan Platters, daughter of William Platters of Saterley in Suffolk. His eldest so Henry predeceased his father in 1620.
- John Chichester (1605–1644) (2nd and eldest surviving son), married Anne Howe, daughter of Francis Howe of East Tilbury, Essex.
- John Chichester (1633–1699) (son), married firstly Ursula Borlase, daughter of Nicholas Borlase of Treludderow, Cornwall, and secondly Mary Kirkham, daughter of Sir William Kirkham of Pinhoe.
- Giles Chichester (1677/8-1724) (son by 1st marriage), married Catherine Palmer (died 1730), daughter and heiress of James Palmer and niece of *Roger Palmer, 1st Earl of Castlemaine (1634–1705).
- John Chichester (1707–1783) (son), married firstly Elizabeth Courtenay (1693–1763), youngest daughter of John Courtenay (1659–1724) of Molland, and co-heiress of her brother John Courtenay (died 1732), without issue; secondly in 1764 to Mary MacDonald (1738–1815), daughter of Major Donald MacDonald of Fernardrist, Inverness. She was buried in the Catholic Chapel at Bath.
- John Palmer Chichester (1769–1823) (son by 2nd marriage), an officer in the Guards, married firstly in 1790 Mary Cary (died 1791), daughter of George Cary of Torre Abbey, Torquay.
- Sir John Palmer Bruce Chichester, 1st Baronet (1794–1851) (son by 1st marriage), created "Baronet of Arlington Court" in 1840, an officer in the Royal Navy and MP for Barnstaple in 1832, 1835 and 1837. He married in 1838 Caroline Thistlethwaite, daughter of Thomas Thistlethwaite of Southwick Park, Hampshire.
- Sir Alexander Palmer Bruce Chichester, 2nd Baronet (1842–1881) (son), JP and DL, Sheriff of Devon in 1868. In 1871 he published his "History of the Family of Chichester". He married in 1865 Rosalie Amelia Chamberlayne, 3rd daughter of Thomas Chamberlayne of Cranberry Park, Hampshire. The marriage was without male issue. She survived her husband and married secondly her late husband's distant cousin and neighbour, Sir Arthur Chichester 8th Baronet of Youlston Park, Shirwell, immediately to the south-west of Arlington. His sole heiress was his only daughter:
- Rosalie Caroline Chichester (died 1949), who died unmarried and gave Arlington Court to the National Trust.

== Church of St James ==
The parish church of St James lies 500 yards east of Arlington Court. It was largely rebuilt in 1846 by the Chichester family to the design of R. D. Gould, but the tower survives from the old church, the old lower roof line being visible on the eastern wall. A 14th-century recumbent effigy of a lady exists under a niche set into the north wall of the chancel, said by Lysons (1822) to be of a member of the de Ralegh family, from which the Chichesters inherited the manors of Arlington and Ralegh on the 1365 marriage of Jonh Chichester to Thomasine de Ralegh, daughter and heiress of Sir John de Ralegh. The Chichester family were for many generations after the Reformation recusant Catholics and thus had little involvement in the administration of the parish church at Arlington. The mural monuments of two of the rectors during this period exist in the church, including the mural monument of Rev. Gascoigne Canham (died 1667).

=== Monument to Rev. Gascoigne Canham (died 1667) ===
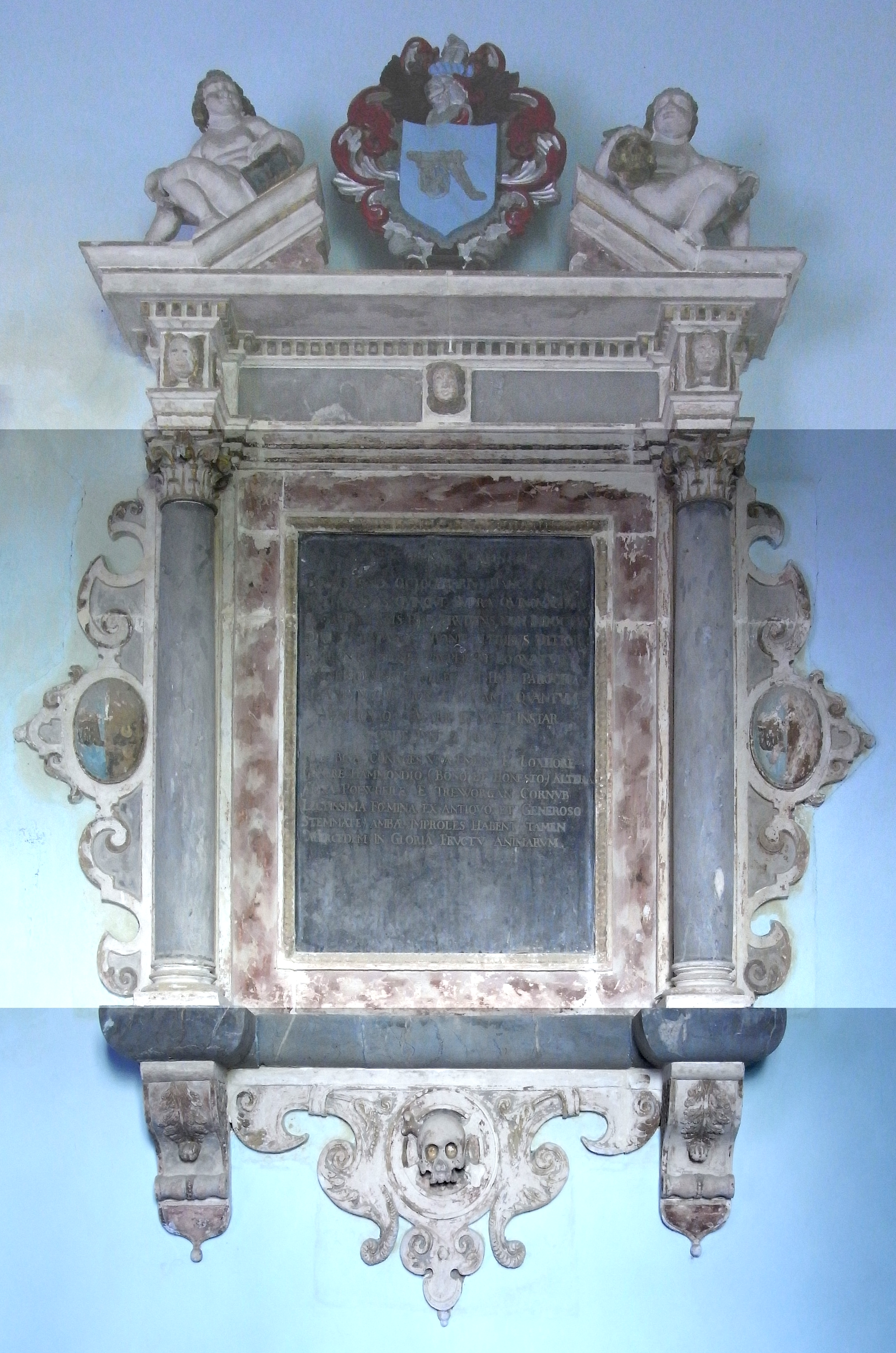
Mural monument to Rev. Gascoigne Canham (died 1667), Rector of Arlington, north wall of chancel, St James Church, Arlington

There exists on the north side of the chancel of St James Church, Arlington, a mural monument to Gascoigne Canham (died 1667), Rector of Arlington. The Chichesters were recusant Catholics, and thus were barred from exercising their ancient right as lords of the manor of exercising the advowson. They thus had little connection to the administration of the parish for many generations. Henry Chichester (1578–1650) of Marwood, a younger son of Henry Chichester (died 1589) of Arlington, married Hester Canham (died 1622), to whom a monument exists in Bittadon Church. She was the daughter of Rev. Simon Canham, "chaplain to the Earl of Bath" (William Bourchier, 3rd Earl of Bath (bef. 1557–1623) of Tawstock), Rector of St Peter's Church, Tawstock, having been appointed to the vacant living on 23 April 1578 by the patron huc vice John Chichester (died 1586), Esq., of Raleigh and Youlston. He died in 1622/3 and was succeeded by Rev. Oliver Naylor appointed 15 March 1622-3 by the patron Edward Bourchier, 4th Earl of Bath. Gascoigne Canham may have been her brother or other relative. He was certainly from a Norfolk family, as his monument states, possibly the Canhams of Ashill as the will exists in the National Archives of a certain John Canham, yeoman, of Ashill in Norfolk, dated 28 January 1577, and also of Simon Canham dated 23 March 1584. He was also patron of nearby Bratton Fleming, 2 1/2 miles south-east of Arlington, which advowson he had purchased in 1665 from Sir Francis Godolphin for £300, and on 27 March 1667 he signed a deed granting the advowson in perpetuity to Gonville and Caius College, Cambridge, of which he was a member. He also gave £10 toward the "Combination Room" of that college. He made a gift of £40 for apprenticing the poor children of Arlington. In 1640 he had received release and quitclaim of the messuage lands and appurtenances of Viveham (2 miles south-west of Arlington, now Viveham Farm) in East Down. In 1653 he financed the rebuilding of Bradiford Bridge in the parish of Pilton, and a stone tablet, now much worn, built into the structure, is engraved with the following inscription above and below the image of a cannon on an escutcheon: "Rebuilded by G.C. 1653". He held lands in the manor of Pilland in the parish of Pilton. His second wife was of the family of Polwhele of Treworgan in Cornwall, ancestors of the Devon historian Richard Polwhele (1760–1838). Above his monument are shown the canting arms of Canham: Azure, a cannon (sable?), whilst on either side are shown his arms impaling: dexter: Hammond of Loxhore: Or, per cross four crescents azure; sinister: (very worn) Sable, a saltire engrailed ermine (Polwhele) His second wife was from the Hammond family, the leading family of the parish of Loxhore, one mile south of Arlington, in the church of which exist two monuments to the family, Edward Hammond (died 1614) and Philip Hammond (died 1704). John Hammond was Physician to King James I and purchased Chertsey Abbey in Surrey in 1602. In 1607, whilst physician to the Prince of Wales, he was granted these arms by St George Norroy Herald, with the addition of a canton azure charged with an ostrich feather in pale argent, being a reference to the Prince of Wales' badge. John Hammond's third son Thomas Hammond, of Byfleet, Surrey, was a judge and one of the regicides of King Charles I, whilst his younger brother was Rev. Henry Hammond (1605–1660) the chaplain to King Charles II. John's grandson Col. Robert Hammond (1621–1654) was a famous parliamentary soldier during the Civil War, Governor of the Isle of Wight and gaoler of King Charles I there from 1647–1648. The text inscribed on a slate tablet on the monument is as follows:

Gascoignus Canham bonus senex octogenarius hanc eccl(es)iam rexit annos quinque supra quinquaginta Norfolciensis pius prudens non indoctus. Dives nummis at bonis operibus ditior: si silent viscera pauperum loquatur marmor quantum legavit huic parochiae, quantum col(legiae) Gon(ville) (et) Cai(us) Cant(abrigiae), quantum undiquaq(ue) – maris et solis instar. Obiit Jun(ii) 2.o (secundo) 1667. Huic binae conjuges, una Emlyn e Loxhore genere Hammondio (bono et honesto) altera Anna Polwheile e Treworgan Cornub(iae) (lectissima foemina ex antiquo et generoso stemmate) ambae improles, habent tamen mercedem in gloria (et) fructu animarum

Which may be translated literally as:

Reverend Gascoigne Canham, a seventy-year-old man ruled this church for five above fifty years. Of Norfolk, pious, prudent, not unlearned; rich in coin but in good works richer. If the hearts of the poor are silent, let this marble tell how much he bequeathed to this parish; how much to the College of Gonville and Caius, Cambridge, how much on all sides, as great as the sun and the sea. He died on 2 June 1667. To him were two wives, one Emlyn from the Loxhore family of Hammond (reverend and honourable), the second Anna Polwheile from Treworgan, Cornwall ( a most select lady from an ancient and noble stock), both without children. They have however their reward in the fame and fruit of their souls.
