= David Hammond =

David Hammond may refer to:

- David Hammond (director) (born 1948), American director and acting teacher
- David Hammond (swimmer) (1881–1940), American freestyle swimmer and water polo player
- David Hammond (broadcaster) (1928–2008), broadcaster from Northern Ireland
- David Hammond (presenter) (born 1995), Irish radio presenter

== See also ==
- David Hammons (born 1943), American artist
