= Marcus Stern =

Marcus Stern may refer to:

- Marcus Stern (journalist) (born 1953), American journalist
- Marcus Stern (theatre director), associate director of the American Repertory Theater
