= The Tibetan Book of the Dead (opera) =

American opera by Ricky Ian Gordon

The Tibetan Book of the Dead: A Liberation Through Hearing is the first opera by American composer Ricky Ian Gordon. The libretto is from Jean-Claude van Itallie's theatrical adaptation of Buddhist teachings, Tibetan Book of the Dead or How Not to Do It Again.

The creation of the opera was initiated by the then-General Director of Houston Grand Opera (HGO), David Gockley. It was commissioned by Houston Grand Opera and The American Music Theater Festival in 1995.

The work is dedicated to Gordon's partner, Jeffrey Michael Grossi, who died in 1996.

The Tibetan Book of the Dead: A Liberation Through Hearing was published in 2015 by the Theodore Presser Company

== Performance history ==
The premiere production of The Tibetan Book of the Dead was performed by members of the Houston Grand Opera Studio on May 31, 1996, at the Wortham Theater at Rice University. The conductor was Charles Prince, and the stage director was Marcus Stern. The opera received critical acclaim and secured Gordon's place in the operatic genre. Despite its success and subsequent academic productions, most notably in 2018 by Eastman Opera Theater at Eastman School of Music, the opera had not received a professional staging for nearly 28 years until it was produced by Opera Grand Rapids in 2024.

== Roles ==
Roles, voice types, premiere cast
Role	Voice type	Premiere cast, May 31, 1996 Conductor: Charles Prince Director: Marcus Stern	Revival cast, February 9, 2024 Conductor: Tyson Deaton Director: Julia Mintzer
Reader	baritone	Frank Hernandez	Nathan Gunn
The Dying/The Dead	soprano	Jonita Lattimore	Indira Mahajan
Soprano 1	soprano	Nicole Heaston	Jennifer Zetlan
Mezzo 1	mezzo-soprano	Beth Clayton	Lisa Chavez
Mezzo 2	mezzo-soprano	Jill Grove	Allison Gish
Tenor 1	tenor	John McVeigh	John Kun Park
Tenor 2	tenor	Gabriel Gonzalez	Michael Boley
Bass	bass/baritone	Eric Owens	Suchan Kim

== Synopsis ==
From the introductory page of the score: "Based on some of the most sacred and revered texts ever written, The Tibetan Book of the Dead depicts the epic journey of a dying soul through a series of spiritual and emotional planes along the road of rebirth."

1. The Dying
2. The Moment of Death
3. Clear White Light
4. The Peaceful Energies
5. Rainbow Dance
6. Dream-like Realms
7. The Angry Energies
8. Mahakala
9. Lord of Death
10. Wandering Prayer
11. Realizing I Am Dead
12. Pursued by Demons
13. Hungry ghost
14. Love Making
15. Refusing to See
16. Choosing a Home
17. Entering Again

== Instrumentation ==
The opera is orchestrated for:

- Woodwind: flute (doubling alto flute and piccolo), clarinet in B♭ (doubling bass clarinet)
- Brass: trumpet in B♭, French horn
- Percussion (3 players): drum set, tom roms (3+), snare drum, side drum, bass drum, temple blocks, woodblocks, castanets, bongos, gong (Tam Tam), ratchet, suspended cymbal, crash cymbal, whip (clapper), triangle, shaker, gourd, tambourine, acme siren, glockenspiel, xylophone, vibraphone, marimba, Bells, chimes, timpani (C_{2}–E♭_{3})
- Keyboard: piano
- Strings: harp, 1 violin, 1 cello, 1 double bass

== Broadcast recording ==
A performance of The Tibetan Book of the Dead was audio recorded and later broadcast on September 28, 1996, on KUHF-FM Radio in Houston, Texas.
