= Frank Davis (Australian rules footballer) =

Australian rules footballer

Personal information
- Full name: Frank Davis
- Born: 25 August 1944 (age 82)
- Original team: Melbourne under-19s
- Height: 178 cm (5 ft 10 in)
- Weight: 78 kg (172 lb)
- Position: Back pocket

Playing career^{1}
Years	Club	Games (Goals)
1964–1973	Melbourne	168 (2)
- ^{1} Playing statistics correct to the end of 1973.

Career highlights
- VFL premiership: 1964; Keith 'Bluey' Truscott Medallist: 1970; Melbourne captain: 1971–1972

Frank Davis (born 25 August 1944) is a former Australian rules footballer who played for Melbourne in the Victorian Football League (VFL).

Davis was educated at Salesian College, Chadstone. He made his debut in Melbourne's premiership winning season of 1964 and despite managing just six games he was a member of the grand final winning team in his rookie season. Davis started his career with a bang by kicking a goal with his first kick but then didn't manage another for eight years. Instead of a goal sneak he turned into a reliable defender off the half-back flank or in the back pocket. He was club captain from 1970 to 1972, earning their best and fairest award in his first season in charge. He also represented Victoria at interstate football during his career.

He served as an assistant coach to Carl Ditterich Melbourne in 1979 and has been credited as the senior coach for the Round 8, 1979 match where Ditterich was suspended.

He passed his athletic prowess to his grandson, Jack Davis, who is a lacrosse player in America.

He worked as country development officer with the Hawks between from 1982 to 1985, and as recruiting manager during four Hawthorn premierships between 1986 and 1995. In retirement, he still works in a casual recruiting role with the Hawks.

== Playing statistics ==
Legend
G	Goals	K	Kicks	D	Disposals	T	Tackles
B	Behinds	H	Handballs	M	Marks

Season	Team	No.	Games	Totals							Averages (per game)						
Season	Team	No.	Games	G	B	K	H	D	M	T	G	B	K	H	D	M	T
1964	Melbourne	40	6	1	—N/a	—N/a	—N/a	—N/a	—N/a	—N/a	0.2	—N/a	—N/a	—N/a	—N/a	—N/a	—N/a
1965	Melbourne	6	18	0	1	183	14	197	35	—N/a	0.0	0.1	10.2	0.8	10.9	1.9	—N/a
1966	Melbourne	6	13	0	0	115	6	121	33	—N/a	0.0	0.0	8.8	0.5	9.3	2.5	—N/a
1967	Melbourne	6	17	0	0	195	14	209	44	—N/a	0.0	0.0	11.5	0.8	12.3	2.6	—N/a
1968	Melbourne	6	16	0	0	187	16	203	32	—N/a	0.0	0.0	11.7	1.0	12.7	2.0	—N/a
1969	Melbourne	6	16	0	0	218	19	237	43	—N/a	0.0	0.0	13.6	1.2	14.8	2.7	—N/a
1970	Melbourne	6	22	0	0	303	22	325	70	—N/a	0.0	0.0	13.8	1.0	14.8	3.2	—N/a
1971	Melbourne	6	21	0	0	286	36	322	60	—N/a	0.0	0.0	13.6	1.7	15.3	2.9	—N/a
1972	Melbourne	6	21	0	1	261	33	294	68	—N/a	0.0	0.1	12.4	1.6	14.0	3.2	—N/a
1973	Melbourne	6	18	1	0	174	18	192	34	—N/a	0.1	0.0	9.7	1.0	10.7	1.9	—N/a
Career			168	2	2	1922	178	2100	419	—N/a	0.0	0.0	11.9	1.1	13.0	2.6	—N/a
