= Salesian College (Chadstone) =

College Chadstone College Salesian

- Entrance to college hall and the music rooms upstairs (Savio Street exit)

Location
- 10 Bosco Street, Chadstone, Melbourne, Victoria; Australia; 37°52′56″S 145°6′1″E

Information
- Type: Independent
- Motto: Latin: Omnia Omnibus (To Be All Things To All)
- Religious affiliation: Catholic
- Denomination: Roman Catholic (Salesians)
- Patron saint: Don Bosco
- Established: 1957; 69 years ago
- Chairman: Timothy Costelloe
- Rector: Father Craig Jones
- Principal: Mark Ashmore
- Years: 7–12
- Gender: Men
- Enrolment: 982
- Colours: Navy blue, red, grey
- School fees: $7,130–$7,960 AUD
- Affiliation: Associated Catholic Colleges
- Website: www.salesian.vic.edu.au

Salesian College Chadstone is a Roman Catholic Independent school for boys located in the Melbourne suburb of Chadstone that was established in 1957. Founded on the philosophies of Saint John Bosco, the college aims to offer a Salesian ideal of education. Salesian comprises two campuses – Bosco (Years 9–12) being the school's main campus and Mannix (Year 7–8) catering as the main campus for year 7 to 8s, due to the recent additions to the Mannix campus.

Salesian is a member of the Associated Catholic Colleges.

== Curriculum ==
Salesian College offers its senior students the Victorian Certificate of Education (VCE) as well as the Vocational Major Program (VM).

VCE results 2012-2025
Year	Rank	Median study score	Scores of 40+ (%)	Cohort size
2012	172	30	7.3	204
2013	124	31	10.4	190
2014	120	31	11.4	182
2015	129	31	8.7	187
2016	127	31	9.1	167
2017	156	31	5	167
2018	152	31	6.4	229
2019	135	31	8	214
2020	210	30	4	164
2021	132	31	8.5	234
2022	127	31	8.9	233
2023	89	32	11.7	263
2024	84	32	11.7	234
2025	161	30	9.9	233

== Sport ==
Salesian has won the following ACC premierships.

- Badminton (4) – 2016, 2017, 2019, 2021
- Basketball – 1999
- Cricket (2) – 1971, 2023
- Lawn Bowls – 2018
- Soccer (4) – 1999, 2000, 2003, 2015

== Notable alumni ==
- Raff Ciccone – Labor Senator for Victoria; Chair of the Parliamentary Joint Committee on Intelligence and Security; and Chair of the Foreign Affairs, Defence and Trade Legislation Committee in the Senate
- Brendan Cole – 2010 Commonwealth Games 4 × 400 m hurdles relay gold medalist; 2012 Australian Olympian
- Riley Collier-Dawkins – AFL footballer
- Nicolas Conte (2016) – Australian Broadcaster (Fox FM and Triple M)
- Timothy Costelloe SDB – Archbishop of the Archdiocese of Perth
- Frank Davis – AFL Footballer, Melbourne Demons (Melbourne Premiership Player 1964, Best & Fairest 1970)
- Simon Hammond – author, entrepreneur, journalist, business advisor and international keynote speaker
- Kevin Morris – AFL Footballer, Richmond and Collingwood. (Richmond Premiership Player 1973 and 1974, Best & Fairest 1975)
- Robin Nahas (2005) – AFL Footballer, Richmond
- Dirk Nannes (1976-) – professional cricketer
- Steve Pantelidis – Soccer player, Melbourne Victory and Gold Coast United (Melbourne Victory Championship and Premiership player 2006/2007 & 2008/2009)
- Dean Rice – AFL Footballer, St Kilda and Carlton. (Carlton Premiership Player 1995)
- Matthew Robbins – AFL Footballer, Geelong and Western Bulldogs
- Gerry Wood – Politician, Northern Territory MLA, representing the electorate of Nelson
- Josh Cavallo – Soccer Player, Adelaide United and Stamford Association Football Club

== See also ==
- List of schools in Victoria
- Victorian Certificate of Education
- Associated Catholic Colleges of Victoria
