= John Hammond (physician) =

English physician

- Born: c. 1555; London
- Died: 1617
- Occupation: Physician

John Hammond (c. 1555–1617) was an English physician.

== Biography ==
Hammond was the son of John Hammond, LL.D. He was born in London. He was educated at Trinity College, Cambridge, where he graduated B. A. in 1573, and was elected a fellow. In 1577 he took the degree of M.A., and on 30 August 1603 was incorporated M.D. at Oxford. He was elected a fellow of the Royal College of Physicians on 13 May 1608. He was physician to James I and to Henry, prince of Wales, whom he attended in his last illness in 1612. His signature is attached to the original record of the post-mortem examination of the prince preserved in the Record Office, London. His only published work is an address to Dr. Matthew Gwinne in Greek verse, prefixed to Gwinne's 'Vertumnus,' 1607. He died in 1617. His youngest son, Henry Hammond, was the famous divine; an elder son, Robert, was father of Colonel Robert Hammond.
