= Institute for Advanced Theater Training =

Harvard University drama school program

American Repertory Theater (ART) Institute for Advanced Theater Training
- Type: Drama School
- Established: 1987
- Founder: Robert Brustein
- Affiliations: Harvard University
- Postgraduates: 22
- Location: Loeb Drama Center; 64 Brattle St, Cambridge, Massachusetts, United States
- Website: Official website

The American Repertory Theater/Moscow Art Theatre (ART/МХАТ) Institute for Advanced Theater Training at Harvard University was founded in 1987 as a training ground for the new American Theater by Robert Brustein.

The institute has been resident for thirty years at Harvard University in the Loeb Drama Center. It lasts for two years (five semesters) including a three-month residency at the Moscow Art Theatre School in Moscow, Russia. The most recent program director was Scott Zigler. New York University director and acting teacher Marcus Stern and Julia Smeliansky, alumnus of the Moscow Art Theatre School, administer the Harvard master classes with Russian master teacher and film star Igor Zolotivitsky (Esteemed Artist of Russia) and dean of the Moscow Art Theatre School and Bulgakov scholar (People's Artist of Soviet Union) Anatoly Smeliansky.

The program accepts about 22 students per year in acting, dramaturgy/theatre studies, and voice and speech who learn both through classroom activities and numerous opportunities for stage-experience including Institute productions as well as direct involvement in American Repertory Theatre productions. As of September 2016, recent Institute productions have included Young Jean Lee's The Shipment, Moira Buffini's Dying for It, and a stage adaptation of They Shoot Horses, Don't They? In addition to performances during the students' academic year, graduating second year students also put on a set of showcase performances to aid their transition into professional work. As of 2016, they are presented in New York City, and Los Angeles.

Up until 2003, the institute also hosted a directing program, and formerly offered a Playwriting program as well.

== History ==
Lacking a department of drama or even a drama concentration, Harvard was understandably reluctant to accept a graduate professional school of drama on the Yale model. When the A.R.T. came to Harvard from Yale in 1979, Robert Brustein originally proposed such a model for actors, directors, and dramaturgs connected to the theater, but was quickly advised that the idea would never fly. It wasn't until 1987, after noting the incidence at Harvard of institutes (e.g. the Nieman and the Bunting Institutes), that Brustein submitted the proposal again, under the name of the American Repertory Theater Institute for Advanced Theater Training. Brustein was permitted to develop a training program in acting, directing, and dramaturgy. From 1999 to 2016, graduates received a Master of Fine Arts from Moscow Art Theater School and a certificate from Harvard University. The graduating classes of 2017 and 2018 received a Master of Liberal Arts from Harvard Extension School and a Certificate of Achievement from the Moscow Art Theater School, which became associated with the school in 1997. The institute's acting program is an intensive combination of classroom exploration and practical production experience. Acting students follow a two-year sequence carefully designed to help them incrementally increase their knowledge of and facility with text analysis, character development, spontaneity and impulse, period and aesthetic style, and overall expressiveness.

=== Suspension of admissions ===
In January 2017, the institute announced they would not be taking on any new admissions for the next academic year after the United States Department of Education gave the graduate program a failing grade due to the oppressive levels of student debt.

In June 2017, the institute's director, Scott Zigler, announced he was taking the job as the dean of the School of Drama at the University of North Carolina School of the Arts.

In July 2017, the graduate-level theater training program announced they would be taking a three-year hiatus of accepting new admissions and they would be working on a strategic plan for the school. In the announcement, Director Zigler said, “What we’re looking at is taking a three-year hiatus so we can come back stronger, better, and with better funding.”

Harvard University reported that the median debt for a student graduating from the two-year program in 2016 was approximately $78,000 with an average starting salary of $36,000 a year.

== Program ==
In July of the first year, students study the Stanislavsky System as a foundation for their graduate acting training. This early training with teachers from the Moscow Art Theatre School focuses on concentration, imagination, observation, relaxation, and action analysis of a text. Classes combine extensive exercises, structured improvisations (also known as études), and textual analysis to help students form a cohesive whole out of their training. The Russian teachers also discuss the artistic and professional ethics of acting, sharing the philosophies of theater that have come to characterize the Russian tradition. In the fall of the first year, students focus on the work of Sanford Meisner and the acting theory developed by David Mamet and William H. Macy known as Practical Aesthetics. This work is designed to help students replace intellectual ideas with impulsive and spontaneous choices engendered by focus on and responsiveness to the actor's partner within an analytic framework. Classes also explore approaches to freeing the students’ creativity and imagination and expanding their range of behaviour in order to create the capability to play a broad range of characters and styles. Fall and winter classes involve extensive scene study, with the primary focus on contemporary work. In the winter, students are introduced to “outside/ in” work: generating character through physical and vocal choices first, followed by internal character choices. Also in the first year, students are encouraged to hone their time management skills. By taking on the demanding conservatory schedule of the institute, students are readied for the scheduling demands of life as a working actor. All acting classes and workshops are closely integrated with training in voice, speech, and movement. These combined skills provide each actor with a number of approaches for conquering the myriad challenges they are likely to encounter as professional actors.

In the spring of the first year, students travel to Moscow for a three-month residency at the Moscow Art Theatre School developing a play to be performed on the Moscow Art Theatre stage. In Moscow, students continue their training in acting, movement, ballet, fencing, acrobatics, singing and voice with Russian master teachers. They have the opportunity to see world theater and immerse themselves in the Stanislavsky System. They also continue studying speech and verse with their Harvard teachers. Students present and perform weekly their first production, an ensemble piece at the American Studio of the Moscow Art Theatre School.

In the second year, back in residence at the A.R.T., students focus on applying skills learned in the first year to a wide variety of styles and genres both on stage and in the classroom. Classes focus on a variety of acting challenges presented by writers such as Tennessee Williams, August Wilson, and Samuel Beckett. Students also focus on contemporary heightened text by playwrights such as Suzan-Lori Parks and Mac Wellman, and spend three weeks on intensive Shakespearean scene study with acting teacher David Hammond. Students perform in Institute productions directed by faculty members and guest artists. In some instances, students will also have opportunities to perform and understudy in A.R.T.’s professional productions. Students may also perform in staged readings or workshops of new scripts being developed by the theater and the Radcliffe Institute at Harvard University.

Because both the American Repertory Theater and the Moscow Art Theatre School are major international institutions, Institute students gain a unique perspective on world theater. Students are encouraged to use this perspective to define their own place in the professional community. As part of an ongoing curriculum on the business of acting integrated into their entire two-year program, students are trained in on-camera and voice-over techniques, as well as having meetings with agents, casting directors, and other entertainment professionals. In the spring of the second year, graduating actors give a showcase presentation in New York and Los Angeles for artistic directors, freelance directors, casting directors, and agents.

== Production history ==
2017-2018

- Macbeth, written by William Shakespeare, directed by Melia Bensussen
- Charlotte's Web, dramatized by Joseph Robinette, based upon the story by E.B. White, directed by Dmitry Troyanovsky
- Familiar, written by Kirsten Greenidge, directed by Rebecca Bradshaw
- Assistance, written by Leslye Headland, directed by Scott Zigler
- Our Town, written by Thornton Wilder, directed by Marcus Stern

=== 2016-2017 ===
- Middletown, written by Will Eno, directed by Marcus Stern
- James and the Giant Peach, adapted for the stage by David Wood, from the book by Roald Dahl, directed by Dmitry Troyanovsky
- Violet, music by Jeanine Tesori, book and lyrics by Brian Crawley, based on The Ugliest Pilgrim by Doris Betts, directed by Sammi Cannold
- Carmen, conceived, directed, and choreographed by Alla Sigalova

=== 2015-2016 ===
- The Shipment, written by Young Jean Lee, directed by Marcus Stern
- The Pirate Princess, music and lyrics by Mike Pettry, book by Lila Rose Kaplan, directed by Allegra Libonati
- A Big Mess, created by Daniel Passer and the A.R.T. Class of 2016, directed by Daniel Passer
- Dying For It, written by Moira Buffini, directed by Scott Zigler
- They Shoot Horses, Don't They?, written by Horace McCoy, directed by Wojtek Klemm
- The Bard for Bryan, Artistic Coordinator: Scott Zigler

=== 2014-2015 ===
- A Bright New Boise, written by Samuel D. Hunter, directed by Marcus Stern
- The Light Princess, music and lyrics by Mike Pettry, book by Lila Rose Kaplan, directed by Allegra Libonati
- Bridge*Widow*Hag, written by Kim Rosenstock, directed by Shira Milikowsky
- Silent Rage, a double bill of two plays – Heroin/e (Keep Us Quiet), written by Carson Kreitzer and Dutchman, written by LeRoi Jones, directed by Scott Zigler
- The Lonely Voice, directed by Ilya Bocarnikovs, inspired by the short stories of Nobel Prize winner Ivan Bunin
- Much Ado About Nothing, written by William Shakespeare, directed by Anya Saffir
- Desdemona: A Play About a Handkerchief, written by Paula Vogel, directed by Melia Bensussen

=== 2007-08 ===
- Gray City, written by Keith Huff, directed by Lindsay Allbaugh
- Expats, written by Heather Lynn MacDonald, directed by Jonathan Carr
- Trigger, written by Kyle Jarrow, directed by Marcus Stern
- The Lacy Project, written by Alena Smith, directed by Scott Zigler
- The Room and Celebration, written by Harold Pinter, directed by Roman Kozak

== Alumni ==
- Jon Bernthal – Acting (2002)
- Betsy Brandt – Acting (1997)
- Ron Burch – Playwriting (1991)
- Debora Cahn – Acting (1998)
- Peter Cambor – Acting (2005)
- Samrat Chakrabarti – Acting (2002)
- Anthony Cistaro – Acting (1997)
- Bart DeLorenzo – Directing
- Maggie Flecknoe – Acting
- M.A. Fortin – Acting (2003)
- Jessalyn Gilsig – Acting (1995)
- Katori Hall – Acting (2005)
- Ellen Idelson – Acting
- Tim Kang – Acting (2001)
- Tina Landau – Directing (1989)
- Gideon Lester – Dramaturgy (1997)
- Jin Maley – Acting
- Careena Melia – Acting (2009)
- Ajay Naidu – Acting (1996)
- Kristin Proctor – Acting (2000)
- Mark Setlock – Acting (1992)
- Zuzanna Szadkowski – Acting (2005)
- Faran Tahir – Acting (1992)
- Kate Whoriskey – Directing (1998)
- Allen Zadoff – Directing (1991)
- Steve Zahn – Acting (1990)
- Jeff Zinn – Directing (1990)
