= Hammonds (surname) =

Hammonds is a surname. Notable people with the surname include:

- Alan Hammonds (born 1955), English singer-songwriter
- Cliff Hammonds (born 1985), American basketball player
- Evelynn M. Hammonds (born 1953), American academic
- Graham Hammonds, British singer
- Jeffrey Hammonds (born 1971), American baseball player
- Rayshaun Hammonds (born 1998), American basketball player
- Shelley Hammonds (born 1983), retired Australian basketball player
- Tom Hammonds (born 1967), American basketball player and drag racer

== See also ==
- Hammond (surname)
