= Michael P. Hammond =

American musician

Michael P. Hammond (June 13, 1932 – January 29, 2002) was an American musician, educator, and eighth chairman of the National Endowment for the Arts.

== Early life ==
Hammond was a native of Kenosha, Wisconsin, and spent much of his childhood in Appleton, Wisconsin. He attended Appleton High School, where he graduated in 1950. He was selected to attend to the American Legion's Badger Boys State program and then went on to represent Wisconsin as one of three senators Boys Nation program in 1949 where he was elected president. Upon returning to Appleton, he was welcomed back by a parade from the train station to city hall.

== Education and medical studies ==
In 1954 he graduated from Lawrence University in Appleton, Wisconsin, with a degree in classics and philosophy. He then studied at Delhi University, where he studied Indian music and philosophy. He took lessons in the sitar from Ravi Shankar. Hammond won a Rhodes Scholarship in 1956 to attend Oxford University, where he studied philosophy, psychology, and physiology at Oxford's Oriel College. He stayed on at Oxford to study pre-medicine, planning on entering a career in medical research.

After completing his work at Oxford, Hammond returned to Wisconsin and spent a year on the Menominee Indian Reservation, learning to speak Menominee and studied the clash between whites and the native population.

Hammond then moved to Milwaukee, Wisconsin, where he worked at the University of Wisconsin–Milwaukee as an instructor in physiology and anatomy and a researcher in neuroanatomy. At the same time he also taught neuroanatomy and physiology at the Marquette Medical School.

== Musical career ==
He also served as the director of the Wisconsin Conservatory of Music in Milwaukee from 1966 to 1968.

In 1968, Hammond moved to New York to serve as the dean of music for the newly created State University of New York at Purchase. In 1977 he became the college's president, working in that role to 1980. While in New York, Hammond served as an associate conductor with the American Symphony Orchestra under Leopold Stokowski and as music director and conductor of the Dessoff Choirs.

Hammond served as the dean of the Shepherd School of Music at Rice University from 1986 to 2001.

== National Endowment of the Arts and death ==
Hammond was appointed by President George W. Bush to head the NEA, and was unanimously confirmed by the Senate on December 20, 2001. He began working at the NEA on January 22, 2002, but died a week later in Washington, D.C., on January 29, 2002. He was 69.
