= Sydney Hammond =

English footballer

Personal information
- Full name: Sydney Frederick Hammond
- Date of birth: 1882
- Place of birth: Woolwich, England
- Date of death: 18 October 1917 (aged 35)
- Place of death: Passchendaele salient, Belgium
- Position(s): Full back

Senior career*
Years	Team	Apps	(Gls)
1904–1908	West Ham	34	(0)
- * Club domestic league appearances and goals

Sydney Frederick Hammond (1882 – 18 October 1917) was an English professional footballer who played as a full back in the Southern League for West Ham United.

== Personal life ==
Hammond was married and worked as a commercial clerk. At the outbreak of the First World War, he enlisted in the Royal Field Artillery. While serving as a corporal, Hammond was killed in action on 17 October 1917 during the Battle of Passchendaele. He was buried in La Clytte Military Cemetery.

== Career statistics ==
Appearances and goals by club, season and competition
Club	Season	League			FA Cup		Total	
Club	Season	Division	Apps	Goals	Apps	Goals	Apps	Goals
West Ham United	1904–05	Southern League First Division	10	0	0	0	10	0
West Ham United	1905–06	Southern League First Division	4	0	0	0	4	0
West Ham United	1906–07	Southern League First Division	16	0	1	0	17	0
West Ham United	1907–08	Southern League First Division	2	0	1	0	3	0
Career total			32	0	2	0	34	0
