= The Hyacinth Macaw =

Play by Mac Wellman

The Hyacinth Macaw is a play written by American playwright Mac Wellman, currently the Donald I. Fine Professor of Play Writing at Brooklyn College, New York City. The New York Times described it as an "entertainingly immoderate portrait of America adrift" It is the second in a series of four Wellman plays called the "Crowtet", along with A Murder of Crows, Second Hand Smoke, and The Lesser Magoo.
