= Simon Hammond =

Australian author

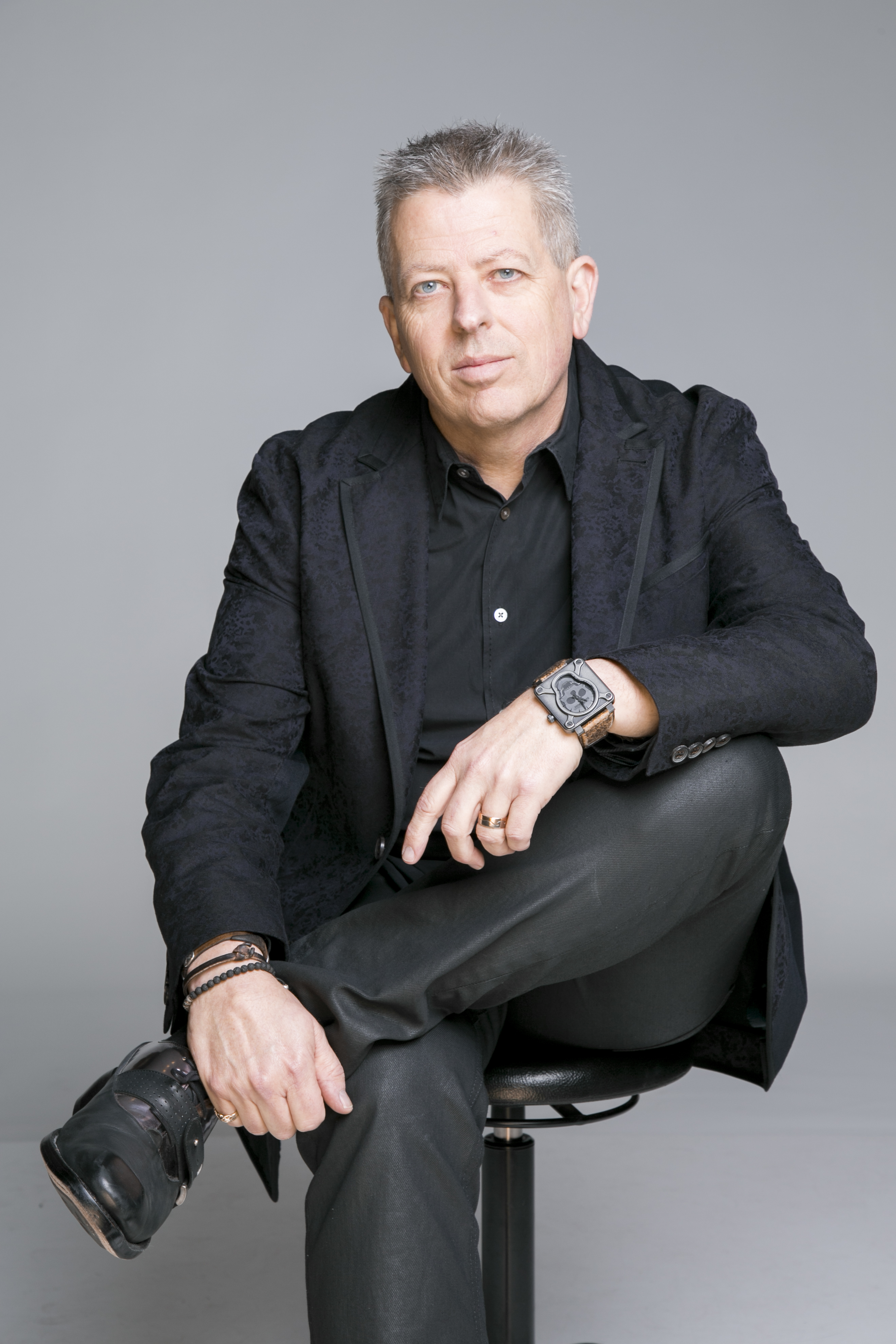
Simon Hammond, 2015

Simon Hammond (born 23 January 1962) is an Australian author, entrepreneur, journalist, business advisor and international keynote speaker.

Born in the United Kingdom, Hammond relocated to Australia in 1969, at the age of seven. He lived in Adelaide with his family through the assisted migration scheme before the family moved to Melbourne. Hammond still resides in Melbourne today.

Hammond attended Salesian College in Victoria from 1974 to 1979, before studying a Bachelor of Journalism at RMIT in 1980. Now, as Industry Fellow in the Faculty of Business and Law at Swinburne University, he resides as an adjunct professor after co-developing the Branding & Innovation Unit teaching Be brands and social insights within the Master of Marketing.

Currently the director and founder of Hammond Thinking and 50 Crates in Melbourne, Australia, Hammond is the author of four books on brand strategy and has founded six brand communications agencies.

== Viewpoints ==
Hammond developed the BE Brand philosophy, maintaining that when a business stands for something based on the emotive drivers of its customer, this will lead to connection and sense of belonging. The BE Brand business strategy process is used in 11 countries across four continents.

Hammond's "MOST" framework from his new book Brutal Truths is also being used alongside BE Branding and the Socratic Method in his new teaching venture - Theatre of Thinking. Launching in December 2020, Theatre of Thinking found an audience in the career development and branding space.

== Career ==
=== Journalism ===
Hammond began his career in Journalism in 1980 as a Cadet reporter at the Knox Sherbrooke News for Leader Newspapers The Leader. In 1982 he joined Mark Day's The Truth in Melbourne where he worked on the investigative team. In 1984 he became Victoria's youngest ever A grade journalist when he took over 4x4 magazine for Syme magazines at age 22. He joined 3AW as Assistant Chief of Staff, before becoming Magazine Development Manager for Syme Magazines in 1986. He ran his own talkback motoring radio show on radio 3UZ for 3 years between 1986 and 1989. In 1988 he established his first brand communications business, Dare Concepts. Since leaving full-time journalism, Hammond has been a contributor to The Herald Sun and is a regular commentator on Channel 7's Today Tonight program.

=== Business Ventures ===
Hammond has established brand communication agencies and methodologies throughout Australia, the USA, Asia, Europe and the UK.

After leaving the world of journalism in 1988, Hammond established his first communications agency with Robyn, Dare Concepts. Dare was initially founded as a PR company but quickly transitioned into a 'big ideas' advertising agency. Dare was well known for its mould-breaking stunts such as the orchestrated kidnapping of a Victorian minister or breaking the land speed record for a caravan.

By 1993, Dare had become a juggernaut in the Melbourne creative industry, gathering large clients like GSK and Land Rover. But wanting to venture increasingly into advertising, Hammond founded The Edge gain with wife Robyn Nelson, and new business partner Ron Barnacle. The Edge made a massive splash when it debuted it's still revered 'roo cull' trilogy of ads for youth outreach service 'Open Family'. 'Roo Cull' showed Australian street kids gunned down, 'Cry Wolf' threw street kids to wolves and 'Waltzing Matilda' included a young Australian putting on blackface and receiving more aid as a result.

After unresolvable creative differences with partner Ron Barnacle caused Hammond to split from The Edge in 1996, Hammond returned to Dare which had been running alongside The Edge and took the reins back from wife Robyn, rebranding it Hammond Dare. The Edge was eventually sold in 2000 and merged with Clemenger Harvie to form Clemenger Harvie Edge, now CHE.

As time passed, Hammond Dare received more acclaim and Hammond formed an idea to make his agency a destination. So, in 2001 SEE was launched, transitioning clients and staff directly from Hammond Dare. SEE became Hammond's largest and best known agency between its 2001 inception and its 2007 sale to Photon Group (now Enero Group). In this time, he found tremendous growth, most notably becoming a published author and developing his most valuable IP - BE Branding. SEE landed clients like NAB while creating a creative space that attracted talent from around the country. The business grew large enough to expand into a second location. After selling in 2006, Photon group transitioned SEE into Belong, which would herald a period of change for Hammond.

His philosophical business model, BE Brands, has been used by business globally since 2003.

After briefly helming the new Photon Group-run business for two years, Hammond left for greener pastures. This would usher in the end of era, with the 21-year old business in his rear view mirror, it would be another 10 years before Hammond fronted a creative agency. In the years since, he co-founded Bastion Brands in 2009 and The Be Counsel in 2010 as well as his one-man operation Hammond Thinking in 2012. Now under Bastion Collective, Bastion Brands continues to be a huge success without Simon's involvement. Similarly The Be Counsel ran for many years with Hammond as a silent partner, and it wasn't until 2018 that he stepped up to helm the agency.

In November 2019, Hammond began his newest business venture 50 Crates. Focusing on the use of the BE Branding philosophy in conjunction with the Socratic method, 50 Crates aims to challenge business leaders by "asking the questions that are hard to ask" and transitions The Be Counsel into his biggest creative venture since SEE in 2001.

Hammond's new creative studio and event centre is set to open mid 2020 in Graham Street, Port Melbourne.

== Writing ==
Hammond has authored three books on the BE Brand philosophy.

Guts: All It Takes To Be Successful In Business (and Life) In 2004, Zatzit Pty Ltd published Hammond’s first book, ‘Guts’. This book explores his business manifesto and personal development. He explains his formula to success using a range of powerful social insights (SINS). The production of Guts led to the formulation of BE Brands.

BE Brands: Simon Hammond’s Creative Brand Revolution In 2006, Wiley Books published Hammond’s second book, BE Brands. The namesake of Hammond’s brand philosophy, this book examines brave brands that have emerged “in a world of risk aversion and corporate blandness”. Focused on the future of customer-centric businesses, Hammond uses popular culture observations, consumer behaviour insights and practical experience to establish the top twenty brands in Australia and what can be learnt from their business transformations.

CEO of Earth: A Ground-Breaking Guide to Building the Ultimate Brand In 2009, Wright Books published Hammond’s third book, CEO of Earth. In contrast to Hammond’s non-fiction publications, CEO of Earth is a fictional tale of an advertising intern, Fysh Reynolds, mistaken as the ‘leader of Earth’ by some tourist traders from another planet. Before he can explain the misunderstanding, Reynolds finds himself in charge of tourism for planet Earth. This tale of branding the ultimate product illustrates how textbook approaches to marketing might work on the biggest brand conceivable and what ‘old school’ methods would need to change for Earth to be the universal brand of choice. In 2013, CEO of Earth was translated into Spanish and became digitally available in ibooks and kindle.

Brutal Truths In 2019, Hammond started putting the pieces together for Brutal Truths, a book chronicling his own life in the business world. He examines in great detail why things don't make sense anymore and posits that amongst a crazy world there is only one thing we can do: go back to the simple notion of knowing where you stand as the world goes by. Published in September 2020 by New Holland Publishers at the height of the Coronavirus Pandemic, Brutal Truths was never meant to be a book about COVID-19, yet explained through Simon's life and business musings what the world could expect in this bold new climate. Part biography, part manifesto, Brutal Truths centres around Simon learning the 6 Brutal Truths of life through personal experiences and developing a process in which anyone can utilise these brutal truths to be their MOST.

== Teaching ==
Hammond has been an adjunct professor at Swinburne University since November 2020, teaching Branding and Innovation within the Master of Marketing. He has also developed an online learning platform that is set to launch with in person and online workshops in 2021.

== Speaking ==
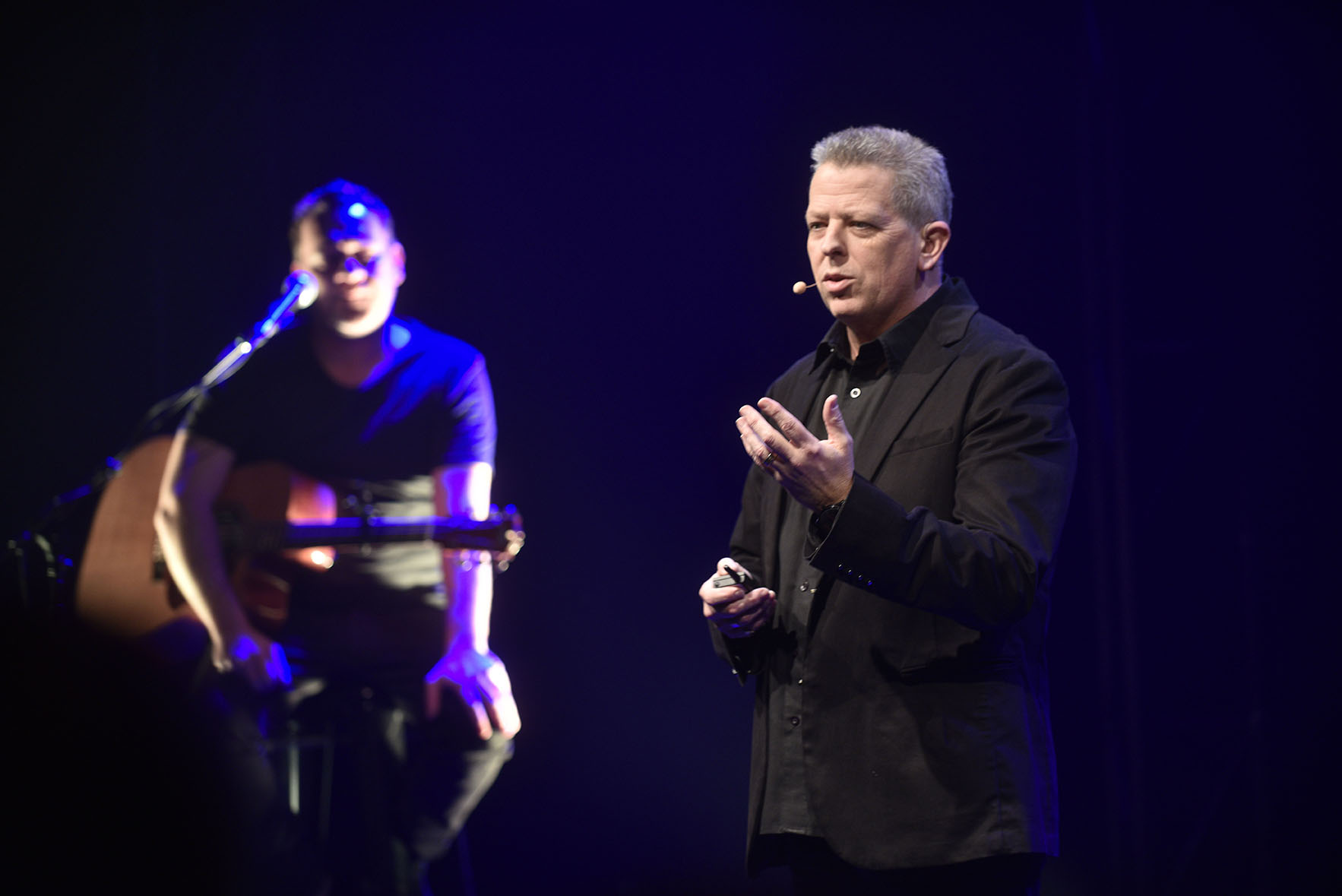
Simon Hammond with collaborator Sam Vandenberg during a performance of Lectern Rock in 2016

Hammond is a frequent keynote speaker, with appearances at The Melbourne International Fashion Festival and Melbourne International Business Forum.

Hammond is also the creator and producer of Lectern Rock. Launched in 2008, Lectern Rock is a theatrical rock seminar program, designed to change the way audiences are engaged on business topics. This program toured Australia four times between 2008 and 2011, seen by over 10,000 businesses in Australia. Lectern Rock is known as Podium Rock outside of Australia and has toured the US.

== Community work ==
Hammond has been active in community and charitable pursuits. He took on pro bono work for Anglicare and Open Family. Hammond also spent time as a board member of Open Family from 1993 - 1995.

Hammond worked for Lifeline for seven years as both a counselor and trainer.

In 1975 he was honoured with a Queen Scout award. Hammond was awarded the inaugural literary award at Salesian college in 1979.
