= Marcus Stern (theatre director) =

Marcus Stern is the associate director of the American Repertory Theater (A.R.T.) as well as the A.R.T./MXAT's Institute for Advanced Theater Training. Stern lives in Cambridge, Massachusetts and has directed numerous productions for the A.R.T. and the Institute for Advanced Theater Training. He also teaches at the Harvard Extension School.

He attended the Foote School in his native New Haven, Connecticut.

Stern is also an established fine art photographer, who recently showed his work at the "Ballad of Life" group exhibit, that was shown in February 2008 at the Armenian Library and Museum of America in Watertown, Massachusetts.

== Directorial work ==
At the A.R.T.:

- Endgame by Samuel Beckett
- Donnie Darko by Richard Kelly
- The Onion Cellar with The Dresden Dolls
- Stone Cold Dead Serious by Adam Rapp
- Nocturne by Adam Rapp
- The Ohio State Murders by Adrienne Kennedy
- Woyzeck by Büchner
- Buried Child by Sam Shepard
- The Accident by Carol Mack
- The American Play by Suzan Lori Parks

At the Institute for Advanced Theater Training:

- Donnie Darko by Richard Kelly
- The Transfiguration of Benno Blimpie by Albert Innaurato
- The Flu Season by Will Eno
- The 4th Graders Present an Unnamed Love-Suicide by Sean Graney

At The Joseph Papp Public Theater:

- The Change Fragments by Hang Ong
- The Treatment by Martin Crimp

At the Theater Neumarkt in Zurich, Switzerland:

- Juliet of the Spirits by Federico Fellini

At the Actors Theatre of Louisville:

- Marisol by José Rivera

At Primary Stages in New York:

- The Hyacinth Macaw by Mac Wellman

At Dance Theater Workshop:

- On the Run by Instant Girl

At the Whitney Museum Biennial:

- The Land of Fog and Whistles by Mac Wellman

At the Magic Theatre:

- The Living Goddess by Neena Beber

At Soho Rep:

- Cross Dressing by Erin Cressida Wilson

At New York University:

- The Marriage of Bette and Boo by Christopher Durang

At the Mark Taper Forum's Taper Too in Los Angeles, California:

- Whole Hearted by Quincy Long
