= Robert Hammond (Roundhead) =

English military officer and politician

Robert Hammond (1621 – 24 October 1654) was an officer in the New Model Army under Oliver Cromwell during the First English Civil War and a politician who sat in the House of Commons in 1654. He is best known for his year-long role in keeping Charles I of England in custody.

== Early life ==
Robert Hammond II was the second son of Robert Hammond I of Chertsey Abbey, Surrey, and grandson of Dr. John Hammond, physician to the royal household under James I who obtained Chertsey Abbey & properties. Robert Hammond II matriculated at Magdalen Hall, Oxford on 20 May 1636 aged 15, but left the university without taking a degree.

== Service in the Civil War ==
Royalist pamphleteers state that Hammond began his military career under Sir Simon Harcourt. In the summer of 1642 he was a lieutenant in the list of the army destined for Ireland; on 6 July he obtained a commission as captain of a foot company of two hundred men, to be levied for the parliament in London and the adjoining counties, and on 11 March 1643 was appointed a captain in Essex's regiment of cuirassiers.

In June 1644 Hammond, then serving under Edward Massie, distinguished himself at the capture of Tewkesbury. In the following October a quarrel between Hammond and Major Grey led to a duel in the streets of Gloucester, in which Grey lost his life. Hammond was tried by court-martial, and unanimously acquitted (28 November 1644), on the ground that he had acted in self-defence. Hammond was in 1645 appointed to the command of a regiment of foot in the New Model Army. At the battle of Naseby Hammond's regiment formed part of the reserve. He took part in the storming of Bristol and Dartmouth and in the battle of Torrington, and captured Powderham Castle and St. Michael's Mount. In October 1645, during the siege of Basing House, Hammond was taken prisoner by the garrison, and when that garrison was captured Oliver Cromwell sent him up to London, to give the House of Commons an account of the victory. The commons voted him £200 to recoup his losses as a prisoner.

== Post-war period ==
After the close of the war in England Hammond was offered the command of a force destined for the relief of Dublin, but played hard to get. In the struggle between army and parliament over the summer of 1647, Hammond was initially with the army. On 1 April 1647 he appeared at the bar of the House of Commons to answer for his conduct in permitting the circulation of the army's petition in his regiment. Only four hundred of his regiment were willing to serve in Ireland, though Hammond himself had declared his conviction that were Philip Skippon commander-in-chief, the greater part of the army would follow him. He signed the vindication of the officers presented to parliament on 27 April 1647, and the letter of the officers to the city on 10 June. He was also one of those appointed to treat with the parliamentary commissioners on behalf of the army on 1 July 1647.

Further on into the summer of 1647 Hammond apparently doubted whether the army was justified in using force against the parliament; he sought and obtained retirement from active military service. On 3 September 1647 Philip Herbert, 4th Earl of Pembroke, who since 1642 had been governor of the Isle of Wight, announced to the House of Lords that Thomas Fairfax, by his authority as commander-in-chief, had commissioned Colonel Hammond to be governor of that island, desired the lords to accept his own resignation, and asked them to pass an ordinance appointing Hammond (which was done on 6 September). In 1648 events rendered weighty the debating point whether Hammond derived his authority from army or parliament. It was then argued by Henry Ireton and the army leaders that the ordinance was a rubber-stamp. The office itself was at this time a sinecure. Hammond was succeeded by his lieutenant-colonel Isaac Ewer in 1647, who had transferred into the New Model Army in April 1645.

== Custodian to the King ==
Charles I of England fled from Hampton Court on 11 November 1647, apparently with the intention of crossing to the Isle of Wight and Hammond, for safety and as a staging post to leaving the country. Hammond had been introduced to the King earlier, at an audience where he made such protestations of loyalty that Charles came to believe him sympathetic. According to Anthony Wood, it was Henry Hammond, Robert Hammond's uncle, who brought him to the king. The actual circumstances of the escape are known largely through the later accounts of the royalist proponents of the plan. John Ashburnham (on his own account) met Hammond as he was going down to his new post, and heard that he went there "because he found the army was going to break all promises with the king, and that he would have nothing to do with such perfidious actions".

On 13 November 1647 Hammond learnt from Sir John Berkeley and Ashburnham that the king had fled from Hampton Court to save his life from the Levellers, and intended to put himself under Hammond's protection. Hammond said that he was undone, and between his duty to the king and his obligations to the army would be confounded. Finally, he gave a vague promise to act with honour. Ashburnham took Hammond to the king on the mainland, and the king came to the Isle of Wight.

Hammond at once wrote to the parliament announcing what had happened; and called the gentlemen of the island together, requiring their co-operation for the defence of his majesty's person. Parliament then drew up a series of instructions to Hammond, ordering him to set a guard over Charles and keep him on the island; a second set of instructions came, on the occasion of the Treaty of Newport, dated 17 August 1648. He was also ordered by the commons to send up Ashburnham, Berkeley, and William Legge as prisoners, and, under protest, obeyed. Thus instead of becoming the king's protector, Hammond found himself his gaoler. His relations with the king were at first pleasant, but after the king's rejection of the 'Four Bills' tendered him by parliament at the end of December 1647, he was more closely confined, and the position of the governor became difficult. Rumours spread of angry scenes; Thomas Herbert complained that Hammond searched the king's cabinet for papers. In the king's secret correspondence in the summer of 1648, he wrote of Hammond's incivility. In May 1648 two of the gentlemen attending the king, Osborne and Dowcett, were accused of a plot to abet his escape, and were arrested. Osborne asserted that Hammond's second in command, Major Rolph, had plotted against the king's life, and that the governor was cognizant of it. He had begged to be relieved from his task.

In November 1648 the breach between the army and the parliament involved Hammond. Cromwell, Ireton, and other representatives of the Council of Officers wrote, arguing that his obedience was owed to the army rather than to the parliament, and that he should take their side in the struggle. On 21 November he received a letter from Fairfax, ordering him to come to St. Albans, and informing him that Colonel Ewer had been sent to guard the king during his absence. This was followed by the appearance of Ewer himself, with instructions to secure the person of the king in Carisbrooke Castle till it should be seen what answer the parliament would make to the army's remonstrance. Hammond felt bound to obey the commander-in-chief, and set out for St. Albans; but he announced his intention of opposing Ewer by force, if necessary, and left the king in charge of Major Rolph and two other officers, with injunctions to resist any attempt to remove Charles from the island. The House of Lords commanded Hammond not to leave his post, but he had already started, and when he tried to return he was detained and put under guard until the king had been seized and carried to Hurst Castle.

Hammond's custody of the king had lasted from 13 November 1647 to 29 November 1648, and parliament voted him a pension.

== Later life ==
During the earlier part of the Commonwealth Hammond took no part at all in public affairs, but his friendship with Cromwell seems to have been only temporarily interrupted. On 22 July 1651 he wrote to Cromwell to intercede for the life of Christopher Love. In 1654, he was elected Member of Parliament for Reading for the First Protectorate Parliament. When Cromwell became Lord Protector he brought Hammond again into employment, and in August 1654 Hammond was appointed a member of the Irish council. He went over at once to Dublin, and began reorganising the judicial system, but was seized with a fever, and died early in October 1654. Simon Ford of Reading is said to have published a book on his death.

== Notes ==
Parliament of England
Preceded by Not represented in Barebones Parliament	Member of Parliament for Reading; 1654	Succeeded by Daniel Blagrave
