= Orway =

Hamlet in Devon, England

Coordinates: 50.858°N 3.310°W

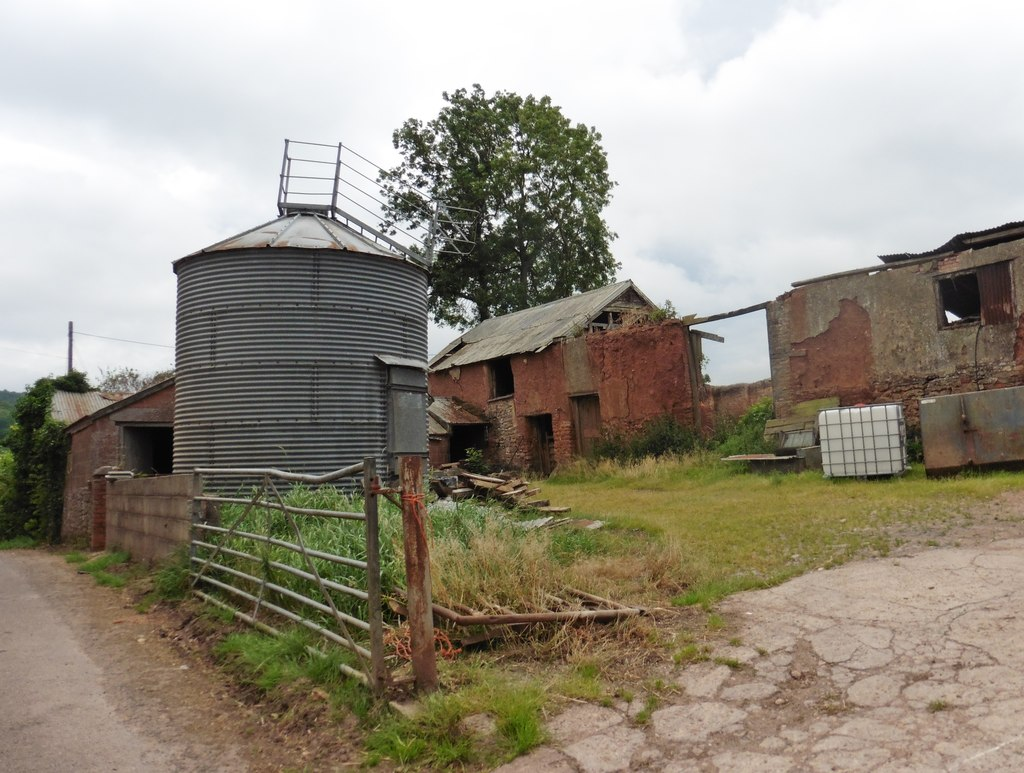
Outbuildings at Orway Farm

Orway is a small hamlet, approximately 1.5 miles squared, situated just on the edge of the Blackdown Hills in Devon, United Kingdom. It is located in the parish of Kentisbeare, near Cullompton.

Orway consists of around fourteen houses and two working farms. There is a third but it no longer operates as a working farm. Orway Crescent Farm is primarily chickens and horses. Orway Porch farm, specialising in crops (largely potatoes) and cows (Friesians), is adjacent.

A stream runs through Orway Farm, past Orway Porch Farm and out through Kentisbeare. The source of the stream is very close to Forest Glade.

The few children who live in Orway attend, mainly, Kentisbeare Primary School and Uffculme School. Due to the location of Uffculme School, the children are collected and returned home via bus.

Orway is approximately 5.5 kilometres from Cullompton and about 10 kilometres from Honiton (as the crow flies).

Directly east of Orway, at the top of the woods is North Hill. This is the home of Devon and Somerset Gliding Club. On most summer days there will be one or two gliders in the sky above Orway. DSGC offer pilot training as well as open days for those wishing to try gliding.

The nearest village, Kentisbeare, has a church, a school, a post office, a public house, a parish hall and a football and cricket club.
