= Treworga =

Hamlet in Cornwall, England

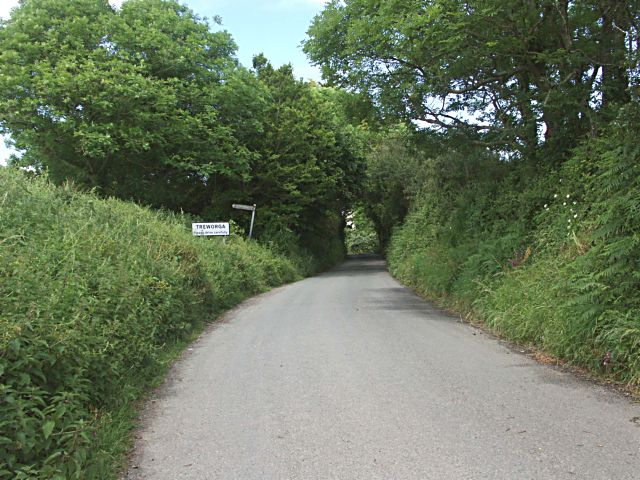
The southern approach to Treworga

Treworga is a hamlet between the villages of Veryan and Ruan Lanihorne on the Roseland Peninsula in Cornwall, England, United Kingdom. Treworga is in the civil parish of Ruanlanihorne.
