= Thomas Hammond (regicide) =

English army officer (died 1658)

Thomas Hammond (c. 1600–1658), was an officer in the New Model Army and involved in the regicide of King Charles I.

== Early life ==
Hammond was the third son of the five children of Dr John Hammond (c. 1555–1617), physician to the royal household under James I, who purchased the site of Chertsey Abbey in Surrey in 1602. His brother was the cleric Henry Hammond.

== Civil War ==
In 1642, at the start of the English Civil War, Hammond was commissioned as an artillery officer. As he was an experienced officer he must have seen military service in the continental wars that preceded the Civil War although there is no direct evidence of this. His motives for joining the Parliamentary side against King Charles I are not recorded, but his radicalism was evident by 1644, when he testified against his own commander-in-chief, Edward Montagu in favour of Oliver Cromwell.

Between 1647 and 1649 he was active member of small committee that represented the interests of the Grandees in the New Model Army in their dealings with the Long Parliament, the Agitators in the army with their and their Leveller allies, and King Charles. He was named as a Commissioner at the High Court of Justice for the trial of Charles I and attending no fewer than fourteen of its sittings, but he did not sign the death warrant. His motives for not signing are not recorded.

== Post Civil War ==
Hammond did not take part in the Cromwellian conquest of Ireland or in the initial invasion of Scotland, but he joined Cromwell at a later date. While in Scotland he fell seriously ill. His health appears never to have fully recovered and he resigned his commission in 1652.

After his retirement he was occupied with obtaining pay arrears due to himself and the other personnel of the artillery train that he had commanded. He was granted Irish lands for his part in the initial campaign of 1642, and along with his men lands confiscated from Royalists in Middlesex and Surrey. In 1657 with his health failing he made his will and he died the next year shortly before his old friend and former commander Oliver Cromwell. After the Restoration his name was exempted from the Indemnity and Oblivion Act allowing the state to confiscate the property that had belonged to him.

== Personal life ==
He married Susan Temple (daughter of John Temple of Frankton) in 1635. Hammond died in 1658.

== Sources ==
- Aylmer, Gerald Edward (January 2008) [2004]. "Hammond, Thomas (c. 1600–1658)". Oxford Dictionary of National Biography (online ed.). Oxford University Press. doi:10.1093/ref:odnb/37506. (Subscription, Wikipedia Library access or UK public library membership required.)
- Malden, H.E., ed. (1911). "Parishes: Chertsey". A History of the County of Surrey. Vol. 3. British History Online. pp. 403–413.
