= Henry Hammond =

English churchman

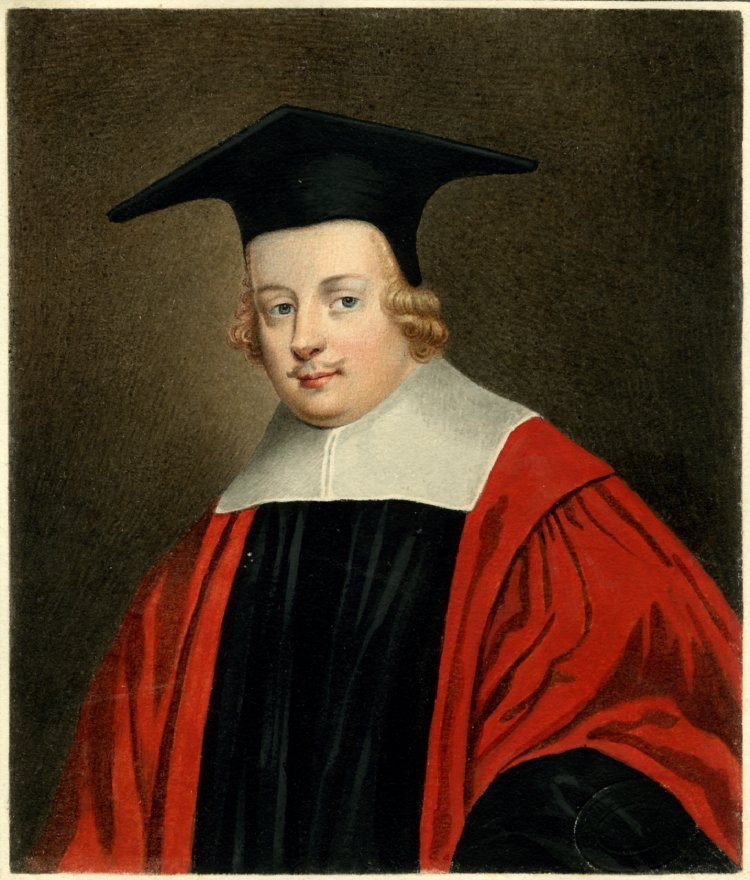
Portrait of Hammond by Sylvester Harding

Henry Hammond (18 August 1605 – 25 April 1660) was an English churchman, church historian and theologian, who supported the Royalist cause during the English Civil War.

== Early life ==
He was born at Chertsey in Surrey on 18 August 1605, the youngest son of John Hammond (c. 1555–1617), physician to the royal household under King James I, who purchased the site of Chertsey Abbey in Surrey in 1602. His brother was Judge Thomas Hammond, a regicide of King Charles I. He was educated at Eton College, and from age 13 at Magdalen College, Oxford, becoming demy or scholar in 1619. On 11 December 1622 he graduated B.A. (M.A. 30 June 1625, B.D. 28 January 1634, and D.D. in March 1639), and in 1625 was elected a fellow of the college. He took Holy Orders in 1629, and in 1633 in preaching before the court, standing in for Accepted Frewen, he won the approval of Robert Sidney, 2nd Earl of Leicester, and was presented with the living of Penshurst in Kent. His mother kept house for him, and aided him in parochial work. He undertook the education of William Temple, and supported the education of the antiquary William Fulman.

== Royalist cleric ==
In 1640 he became a member of convocation, and was present at the passing of Laud's new canons. Soon after the meeting of the Long parliament, the committee for depriving scandalous ministers summoned Hammond, but he declined to leave Penshurst. He was nominated one of the Westminster Assembly, by Philip Wharton, 4th Baron Wharton. In 1643 he was made Archdeacon of Chichester, recommended by Brian Duppa. Instead of sitting in the Assembly, he took part in the unsuccessful rising at Tonbridge in favour of King Charles I: Hammond helped to raise a troop of horse in his neighbourhood for the King's service, and was obliged to flee in disguise for Oxford, then the royal headquarters. He left Penshurst by night in July for the house of a friend, Thomas Buckner, who had been his tutor at Magdalen. Here he was joined by an old friend, John Oliver. When they had to move on, the two set off for Winchester, then held by the Royalists. On their journey a messenger announced to Oliver that he had been chosen President of Magdalen, and Hammond accompanied him to Oxford. Hammond procured rooms in his own college, and devoted himself to study and writing. In 1644 he published anonymously his popular Practical Catechism. One of Charles I's last acts at Carisbrooke Castle was to entrust to Sir Thomas Herbert a copy of the book, to give to his son Henry Stuart, Duke of Gloucester.

Hammond was chaplain to the royal commissioners at the Treaty of Uxbridge (30 January 1645), where he disputed with Richard Vines, one of the parliamentary envoys. He returned to Oxford, and about 17 March 1645 Charles I bestowed upon him a canonry at Christ Church; the university chose him to be public orator at the same time, and he was made one of the royal chaplains. On 26 April 1646 the King fled from Oxford, and Oxford surrendered (24 June 1646). Charles I, on 31 January 1647, the day after his arrival at Holmby House, requested Parliament to allow Hammond and another chaplain to attend him. This was refused on the ground that neither of them had taken the Solemn League and Covenant. When Charles I was removed by the army to Childersley (5 June 1647), Thomas Fairfax and his officers agreed that Charles I's request for his chaplains should be complied with. About a fortnight later Hammond and Gilbert Sheldon, another royal chaplain, in company with James Stewart, 1st Duke of Richmond, joined the king. Parliament sent an order for their removal, but the army, now independent in its power, paid no attention. The chaplains were summoned to the bar of the house, but disregarded the summons. Fairfax wrote deprecating the notion that they would prejudice the peace of the state. At Woburn, Caversham, and Hampton Court, Hammond was constantly with the king.

At Hampton Court Hammond introduced to him his nephew, Colonel Robert Hammond, soon to be governor of the Isle of Wight. Charles I, thinking he might trust his chaplain's nephew, escaped towards the Isle of Wight (12 November 1647), and was placed by the governor in Carisbrooke Castle, where Sheldon and Hammond again joined him. At Christmas 1647 they were removed from their attendance. Hammond returned to Oxford, where parliamentary visitors had been at work. Samuel Fell, dean of Christ Church, was in prison. Hammond, appointed sub-dean of Christ Church, took on the management of the college. He was soon summoned before the visitors at Merton College, and refused to submit to their authority, and was deprived and imprisoned, together with Sheldon, by an order of Parliament. Edward Corbet, a member of the Westminster Assembly, who succeeded to Hammond's canonry at Christ Church in January 1648, resigned it in August, after persuading himself (it is said) that Hammond had acted on principle. Colonel Evelyn, the puritan governor of Wallingford Castle, to whom Parliament sent an order for the custody of Sheldon and Hammond, declined to act as their gaoler, and said that he would only receive them as friends.

At Westwood Hammond settled for the remainder of his life. In August 1651 he attended Sir John Pakington, 2nd Baronet to the royal camp at Worcester, and had an interview with King Charles II. Pakington was taken prisoner at the battle of Worcester, 3 September but soon returned home uninjured. In 1655 an ordinance was issued forbidding the ejected clergy to act as schoolmasters or private chaplains, or perform any clerical functions, thus depriving them of all means of subsistence. Hammond and others were much involved in supporting clergy in this position. In the last six years of his life his health began to fail.

== Death and reputation ==
Hammond died of an attack of stone on 25 April 1660, the day that Parliament voted that the king should be brought back; had he lived he would have been made bishop of Worcester.

He was buried in the family vault of the Pakingtons, in the chancel of Hampton Lovett Church. The monument was sculpted by Joshua Marshall. There is a Latin inscription on his monument by Humphrey Henchman, bishop of Salisbury, and afterwards of London. Hammond left his books to his friend Richard Allestree.

Hammond was held in high esteem even by his opponents. He was an excellent preacher; Charles I pronounced him the most natural orator he had ever heard.

== Works ==
His writings, published in four folio volumes (1674–1684), consist mostly of controversial sermons and tracts; he produced more than 50 separate works.

The Anglo-Catholic Library contains four volumes of his Miscellaneous Theological Works (1847–1850). The best of them are his Practical Catechism, first published in 1644; his Paraphrase and Annotations on the New Testament (1653); and an incomplete work of a similar nature on the Old Testament. His Life by John Fell, prefixed to the collected Works, was reprinted in vol. iv. of Wordsworth's Ecclesiastical Biography.

Hammond was a pioneer Anglican theologian, much influenced by Richard Hooker and Lancelot Andrewes, but also by Arminianism in the form it took in Hugo Grotius, whom he defended in his writings. Some of Hammond's views were highly idiosyncratic: for example, Paraphrase and Annotations on the New Testament emphasized the (supposed) role of Gnosticism as a clandestine "enemy" of ancient Christianity, claiming Gnostics were exceedingly similar to the contemporary Enthusiasts of his own period (who were typically anti-royalist). Yet Hammond was also the first English scholar to compare manuscripts of the New Testament. He relied heavily on his readings in patristics, and with James Ussher and Isaak Voss argued in favour of the authenticity of the Ignatian Epistles, which could be read as supporting episcopacy. He was attacked by Salmasius and David Blondel, and defended himself. His defence and celebration of episcopacy as traditional was then followed by many English high church theologians: Miles Barne, Henry Dodwell, Fell, Peter Heylyn, Benjamin Lany, Thomas Long, Simon Lowth, John Pearson, Herbert Thorndike, and Francis Turner.

He read widely, and was a diligent scholar. He translated Blaise Pascal's Provincial Letters in 1657, under the title of Les Provinciales, or the Mystery of Jesuitisme, discovered in certain letters written upon occasion of the present differences at Sorbonne between the Jansenists and the Molinists, London, Royston, 1657).
