= David Hammond (director) =

American director and acting teacher

- Born: June 3, 1948 (age 78); New York, NY
- Occupations: director, acting teacher, playwright

David Hammond is an American director and acting teacher. He trained for the theatre at the American Academy of Dramatic Arts and received his M.F.A. from the Carnegie Mellon University Drama Department. He did his undergraduate studies at Harvard University and graduated magna cum laude with a concentration in Elizabethan literature. He taught at the Juilliard School, the American Conservatory Theater, and the Yale School of Drama and later became the artistic director of the PlayMakers Repertory Company.

Hammond has continued to teach, at New York University's Graduate Acting Program at Tisch School of the Arts, the American Repertory Theater/Moscow Art Theater School Institute for Advanced Theater Training at Harvard University, and recently at Guilford College.

Hammond served 2018-2023 as the 6th Congressional District Chair for the LGBTQ Democrats of North Carolina.

== Education ==
Hammond trained at the Jules Faber Studio and the American Academy of Dramatic Arts in New York and received an M.F.A. from Carnegie-Mellon University's Drama Department. He also attended Harvard College and graduated magna cum laude focusing on Elizabethan literature.

== Teaching, Directing, Writing ==
Hammond was a teacher at the Juilliard School, the American Conservatory Theater in San Francisco, and the Yale School of Drama, specializing in Shakespeare and the performance of classic texts, and he directed numerous productions for A.C.T. and the Yale Repertory Theatre, including a production of George Bernard Shaw's Philanderer, which was an "effective" production of a hundred year old play because it "exposed patriarchal assumptions that still influenced most of the audience". His 1989 direction of Henrik Ibsen's "The Master Builder" was called "sound and respectful of the text" and led the New York Magazine's John Simon to state "Our theater could use more Hammonds". He subsequently spent 22 years at the PlayMakers Repertory Company at the University of North Carolina at Chapel Hill, 14 of which as artistic director. In 1989 at the PRC, he rescripted the framing material in Taming of the Shrew, cutting some speeches, but adding jugglers and clowns and a drastic scene change to signal the play as being Sly's dream and allowing for a doubling of the Sly/Petruchio and Lord/Vincentio characters which "provided a distinctly different perspective". He also served as a professor and Head of UNC's Professional Actor Training Program. While at PlayMakers, he staged the United States premieres of Simon Bent's A Prayer for Owen Meany and Nick Stafford's Luminosity. Upon his retirement from UNC Chapel Hill as professor emeritus in 2006, he was named Artistic Director Emeritus of PlayMakers Repertory Company. He has both written and adapted plays, and his theatre version of The Nutcracker has been staged at numerous theatres in the United States and Canada. He contributed an essay to Standard Speech: Essays on Voice and Speech on the methods of Edith Skinner.

He has also taught at the American Repertory Theater/Moscow Art Theater School Institute for Advanced Theater Training at Harvard University and the New York University Graduate Acting Program at Tisch School of the Arts. He joined the faculty of Guilford College as Professor of Theatre Studies in 2007 and served as Arts Division Chair and Theatre Studies Chair before retiring as professor emeritus in 2017.

Hammond has directed operas for the San Francisco Opera, the Aspen Music Festival, the Carmel Bach Festival, and the Opera Company of North Carolina and has directed or coached Shakespeare productions for theatres throughout the United States and Latin America. He has also traveled extensively as a Cultural Specialist for the United States Information Service, directing and teaching in Mexico, Argentina, Chile, and Uruguay. He directed Ibsen's The Master Builder for New York's Roundabout Theatre in 1983 and Thornton Wilder's unpublished version of Ibsen's A Doll's House at Guilford College in 2007. In 2011 he directed Hamlet for Empirical Rogue in New York and in 2012 As You Like It for the American Repertory Theater in Cambridge, Massachusetts. He directed Hedda Gabler for Telon Rojo in Montevideo, Uruguay in 2014 and Cat on a Hot Tin Roof for Uruguay's Comedia Nacional in 2015.

Chicago's Polarity Ensemble-Theatre presented his adaptation of Fielding's Tom Jones in March 2012.

=== Reception ===
The New York Times called his production of George Bernard Shaw'sThe Philanderer at the Yale Repertory Theatre in 1982 "not Shavian", but notable for an exuberance that was called "engaging". His production of Shaw's Caesar and Cleopatra at PlayMakers in 2005 was called "superbly cast" with "sublime" staging.

He has received various theatre awards, including one for Luminosity, which was listed as one of the top ten shows of 2004 in North Carolina by Classical Voice of Carolina. He received the Playmaker Award for Lifetime Achievement at the 18th annual PlayMakers Ball on October 29, 2005. He is the recipient of two Los Angeles Drama-Logue Awards and the Florencio Award of the Association of Uruguayan Theatre Critics and was the 2005 Triangle Theatre Review's Best Director and Triangle Theatre Person of the Year.

== Accusation of misconduct ==
In 1997, an accusation of sexual harassment was made against Hammond. A subsequent investigation cleared Hammond of any wrongdoing.
