= David Hammond (presenter) =

Irish radio presenter

- Born: 1995 (age 30–31); Bettystown, County Meath, Ireland
- Education: Dundalk Institute of Technology
- Occupation: Radio presenter
- Employer: SPIN 1038

David Hammond (born 1995) is an Irish radio presenter. He is known for presenting the breakfast show Emma, Dave and Fiona on SPIN 1038. He previously presented the lunchtime show Beat's Big Lunch, Top 7@7 and the Takeover on Beat 102 103.

== Career ==
Hammond began his radio career in 2015 presenting for LMFM, an independent radio station based in Drogheda. After completing college, he joined Beat 102 103, an independent radio station based in South East Ireland, presenting the evening shows Top 7@7 and the Takeover from 2017 to 2019. From 2019 to 2022, Hammond presented the lunchtime show Beat's Big Lunch on Beat 102 103.

In August 2022, Hammond began co-presenting the breakfast show SPIN's Fully Charged with Emma, Dave and Aisling on SPIN 1038.

== Personal life ==
Hammond was born in Bettystown, County Meath. He attended Dundalk Institute of Technology in 2014 and completed his Bachelor of Arts degree in Media, Arts and Technology in 2017.

== Awards ==
On 5 October 2018, Hammond won the Gold Award for Radio DJ of the Year at the IMRO Radio Awards. On 4 October 2019, Hammond won the Silver Award for Radio DJ of the Year at the IMRO Radio Awards. On 2 October 2020, Hammond won the Gold Award for Radio DJ of the Year at the IMRO Radio Awards.

Year	Award	Category	Result	Ref.
2018	IMRO Radio Awards	Gold Award: Radio DJ of the Year	Won	
2019	IMRO Radio Awards	Silver Award: Radio DJ of the Year	Won	
2020	IMRO Radio Awards	Gold Award: Radio DJ of the Year	Won	
