= List of memorials to Ulysses S. Grant =

This is a list of memorials to Ulysses S. Grant, the 18th president of the United States.

== Buildings ==
- Grant Birthplace
- Ulysses S. Grant Home
- Grant Cottage State Historic Site
- Ulysses S. Grant Presidential Library
- Ulysses S. Grant National Historic Site
- Grant High School (Los Angeles)
- U.S. Grant Hotel

== Cities ==
- Grant, Alabama
- Ulysses, Kansas, county seat of Grant County
- Grants Pass, Oregon

== Counties ==
- Grant County, Arkansas
- Grant County, Kansas, and its county seat, Ulysses
- Grant Parish, Louisiana
- Grant County, Minnesota
- Grant County, Nebraska
- Grant County, New Mexico
- Grant County, North Dakota
- Grant County, Oklahoma
- Grant County, Oregon
- Grant County, South Dakota
- Grant County, Washington
- Grant County, West Virginia

== Giant sequoia groves ==
- General Grant Grove

== Holidays ==
- Ulysses S. Grant Day in Missouri

== Military vessels ==
- General Grant (sailing ship)
- USS General Grant
- USRC Grant
- USS President Grant
- USS Ulysses S. Grant

== Parks ==
- Grant Park (Chicago)

== Sculptures ==
- Ulysses S. Grant Memorial
- Statue of Ulysses S. Grant (U.S. Capitol)
- Soldiers' and Sailors' Arch
- Ulysses S. Grant Monument
- These Are My Jewels
- Equestrian statue of Ulysses S. Grant
- Bust of Ulysses S. Grant (San Francisco)
- Grant's Tomb

== Trees ==
- General Grant Tree

== Villages ==
- Grantsburg, Wisconsin
- Grant Park, Illinois

== See also ==
- List of presidents of the United States on currency
- Presidents of the United States on U.S. postage stamps
- Presidential memorials in the United States

== Works cited ==
- Allen, Madelene Fergusson; Scadden, Ken (2009). The General Grant's Gold: Shipwreck and Greed in the Southern Ocean. Exisle Publishing. ISBN 978-0-908988-37-2.
- Cremin, Dennis H. (2013). Grant Park: The Evolution of Chicago's Front Yard. Southern Illinois University Press. ISBN 978-0-8093-3252-6.
- Danilov, Victor J. (2013). Famous Americans: A Directory of Museums, Historic Sites, and Memorials. Scarecrow Press. ISBN 978-0-8108-9185-2.
- Gard, Robert E. (2015). The Romance of Wisconsin Place Names. Wisconsin Historical Society. ISBN 978-0-87020-707-5.
- Holzer, Harold (2019). Monument Man: The Life and Art of Daniel Chester French. Chronicle Books. ISBN 978-1-61689-829-8.
- Jacob, Kathryn Allamong (2009). Testament to Union: Civil War Monuments in Washington, D.C.. Johns Hopkins University Press. ISBN 978-0-8018-9095-6.
- McFeely, William S. (2007). Portrait: The Life of Thomas Eakins. W. W. Norton & Company. ISBN 978-0-393-05065-3.
- Miller, George R. (2017). Grant County. Arcadia Publishing. ISBN 978-1-4671-2568-0.
- White, Ronald C. (2017). American Ulysses: A Life of Ulysses S. Grant. Random House. ISBN 978-0-8129-8125-4.
- Wilson, Roy L. (2012). Sheridan and Grant County. Arcadia Publishing. ISBN 978-0-7385-9439-2.
