= 1986 Pulitzer Prize =

Awards for journalism and related fields

The following are the Pulitzer Prizes for 1986.

== Journalism ==
- Public service: The Denver Post
  - "For its in-depth study of "missing children", which revealed that most are involved in custody disputes or are runaways and which helped mitigate national fears stirred by exaggerated statistics."
- General news reporting: Edna Buchanan of The Miami Herald
  - "For her versatile and consistently excellent police beat reporting."
- Investigative reporting: Jeffrey A. Marx and Michael M. York of the Lexington Herald Leader
  - "For their series "Playing Above the Rules," which exposed cash payoffs to University of Kentucky basketball players in violation of NCAA regulations and led to significant reforms.."
- Explanatory reporting: Staff of The New York Times
  - "For a six-part comprehensive series on the Strategic Defense Initiative, which explored the scientific, political and foreign policy issues involved in 'Star Wars'."
- Specialized Reporting: Andrew Schneider and Mary Pat Flaherty of the Pittsburgh Press
  - "For their investigation of violations and failures in the organ transplantation system in the United States."
- National reporting: Craig Flournoy and George Rodrigue of The Dallas Morning News
  - "For their investigation into subsidized housing in East Texas, which uncovered patterns of racial discrimination and segregation in public housing across the United States and led to significant reforms."
- National reporting: Arthur Howe of The Philadelphia Inquirer
  - "For his enterprising and indefatigable reporting on massive deficiencies in IRS processing of tax returns-reporting that eventually inspired major changes in IRS procedures and prompted the agency to make a public apology to U.S. taxpayers."
- International reporting: Lewis M. Simons, Pete Carey and Katherine Ellison of the San Jose Mercury News
  - "For their June 1985 series that documented massive transfers of wealth abroad by President Marcos and his associates and had a direct impact on subsequent political developments in the Philippines and the United States."
- Feature writing: John Camp of St. Paul Pioneer Press and Dispatch
  - "For his five-part series examining the life of an American farm family faced with the worst U.S. agricultural crisis since the Depression."
- Commentary: Jimmy Breslin of the New York Daily News
  - "For columns which consistently champion ordinary citizens"
- Criticism: Donal Henahan of The New York Times
  - "For his music criticism."
- Editorial writing: Jack Fuller of the Chicago Tribune
  - "For his editorials on constitutional issues."
- Editorial cartooning: Jules Feiffer of The Village Voice, New York City
- Spot news photography: Carol Guzy and Michel duCille of The Miami Herald
  - "For their photographs of the devastation caused by the eruption of the Nevado del Ruiz volcano in Colombia."
- Feature photography: Tom Gralish of The Philadelphia Inquirer
  - "For his series of photographs of Philadelphia's homeless."

== Letters and Drama ==
- Fiction: Lonesome Dove by Larry McMurtry (Simon & Schuster)
- History: ...the Heavens and the Earth: A Political History of the Space Age by Walter A. McDougall (Basic Books)
- Biography or Autobiography: Louise Bogan: A Portrait by Elizabeth Frank (Alfred A. Knopf)
- Poetry: The Flying Change by Henry Taylor (Louisiana State University Press)
- General Nonfiction: Common Ground: A Turbulent Decade in the Lives of Three American Families by J. Anthony Lukas (Alfred A. Knopf)
- General Nonfiction: Move Your Shadow: South Africa, Black and White by Joseph Lelyveld (Times Books)
- Music: Wind Quintet No. 4 by George Perle (Galaxy Music)
  Premiered on October 2, 1985
