= Roman Bronze Works =

New York City foundry, 1897–1988

Roman Bronze Works, now operated as Roman Bronze Studios, is a bronze foundry in New York City. Established in 1897 by Riccardo Bertelli, it was the first American foundry to specialize in the lost-wax casting method, and was the country's pre-eminent art foundry during the American Renaissance (ca. 1876–1917).

== History ==
Bertelli was a chemical engineer from Genoa who combined his skill in chemistry with his interest in art in starting a foundry. The foundry trademarked its namesake, Roman Bronze Works in 1900. In 1908, the foundry built a home and studio for sculptor Harry Merwin Shrady at White Plains, New York. It was added to the National Register of Historic Places in 1982 as the Leo Friedlander Studio. Long a sub-contractor to Louis Comfort Tiffany's Tiffany Studios, the foundry moved in 1927 to Tiffany's red brick factory in Corona, Queens, New York. The General Bronze Corporation purchased the Roman Bronze Works in 1928. This ownership lasted for twenty years, up until 1948, during which it produced some of its finest bronze artworks from sculptors such as Paul Manship and Rene Chambellan to Lee Lawrie.

The foundry's mold makers, casters, chasers and finishers, and patinaters cast sculptures from plaster and terra cotta models provided by sculptors. They also scaled down monumental and other finished works for editions of collectors' bronzes, allowing works by Daniel Chester French, Augustus Lukeman and Augustus Saint-Gaudens to ornament a private library or drawing room. From 1898, Frederic Remington worked exclusively with Roman Bronze Works, as did Charles M. Russell. Remington bronzes were being cast by Roman Bronze Works as late as the 1980s. Roman Bronze Works was purchased in 1946 by Salvatore Schiavo, whose father had worked at the foundry since 1902. His nephew, Philip J. Schiavo, the grandson of the first Schiavo, was the president of the foundry until its closing.

The Heisman Trophy was originally made by Dieges & Clust in New York (and later Providence, Rhode Island) from its inception in 1935 until 1980, when Dieges and Clust was sold to Herff Jones. However, for a time until at least 2008, the Roman Bronze Works cast the Heisman Trophy statues awarded annually to the best college football player and his university.

After the foundry closed, original plaster models of major works by American artists Frederic Remington, Daniel Chester French, Charles Russell, Bessie Potter Vonnoh and Anna Hyatt Huntington were auctioned off in New York on September 17, 1988. Some of the molds were moved to warehouses in Copiague, New York, under the aegis of American Art Restoration, Inc.

The business archives were preserved and are now at the Amon Carter Museum Library in Fort Worth, Texas. In 2002, Schiffer Publishing released a book about Roman Bronze Works, A Century of American Sculpture; The Roman Bronze Works Foundry, written by Lucy D. Rosenfeld and based on the firm's ledgers and archival photographs at the museum.

Brian Ramnarine, who worked at Roman Bronze Works and opened his foundry in Queens (Long Island City) NY under the name Empire Bronze Art Foundry, was charged in Manhattan Federal Court in November 2012 with an $11 million scheme to sell an unauthorized casting of a work by Jasper Johns. He was arraigned in October 2002 on charges of grand larceny, falsifying business records, scheme to defraud and criminal simulation. In February 2003 he pleaded guilty to making unauthorized copies of sculptures, agreeing to pay $100,000 in restitution.

== Notable works ==
- Bronco Buster, one of many sculptures created by Remington and cast by Roman Bronze Works (ca. 1901)
- Confederate Soldiers Monument Sculptures by Pompeo Coppini located on the grounds outside the Texas State Capitol in Austin, Texas (1903)
- The Marquis de Lafayette, by Paul Wayland Bartlett, Hartford, Connecticut (1907)
- Leo Friedlander Studio in Greenburgh, Westchester County, New York (1908)
- Stevens T. Mason by Albert Weinert (1908)
- Stephenson Grand Army of the Republic Memorial by J. Massey Rhind at Indiana Plaza in Washington, D.C. (1909)
- McMillan Fountain by Herbert Adams at McMillan Reservoir in Washington, D.C. (1912)
- Equestrian statue of George Washington by J. Massey Rhind in Washington Park, Newark, New Jersey (1912)
- The Great Rivers, the Missouri and the Mississippi, by Robert Ingersoll Aitken, Missouri State Capitol, Jefferson City, Missouri (1917)
- Dante Alighieri by Ettore Ximenes at Meridian Hill Park in Washington, D.C. (1921)
- Ulysses S. Grant Memorial by Henry Shrady at Capitol Hill in Washington, D.C. (1924)
- Pioneer Woman, by Bryant Baker, Ponca City, Oklahoma (1930)
- Prometheus (Manship) (1934)
- Atlas, iconic statue by Lee Lawrie located in Rockefeller Center (1937)
- Thomas Jefferson Statue located in the Jefferson Memorial in Washington D.C. by Rudolph Evans (1947)
- Heisman Trophy by Frank Eliscu (1980-2008)

== Artists ==
Artists who had works cast by the Roman Bronze Works include:

- Herbert Adams
- Robert Aitken
- Carl Ethan Akeley
- Louis Amateis
- John Angel
- Joseph Bailly
- Bryant Baker
- Max Kalish
- Clement Barnhorn
- Richmond Barthé
- Paul Wayland Bartlett
- Chester Beach
- Thomas Hart Benton
- Edward Berge
- Karl Bitter
- Gutzon Borglum
- Solon Borglum
- John J. Boyle
- Caspar Buberl
- Alexander Stirling Calder
- Mary Callery
- Rene Paul Chambellan
- James L. Clark
- Matchett Herring Coe
- Pompeo Coppini
- William Couper
- Henri Crenier
- John K. Daniels
- Jo Davidson
- Donald De Lue
- Gleb Derujinsky
- Alexander Doyle
- Thomas Eakins
- Frank Eliscu
- Ulric Ellerhusen
- Rudolph Evans
- Avard Fairbanks
- Sally James Farnham
- Nicolai Fechin
- Gaetano Federici
- Beatrice Fenton
- Duncan Ferguson
- Alexander Finta
- John Flanagan
- James Earle Fraser
- Marshall Fredericks
- Daniel Chester French
- Leo Friedlander
- Harriet Whitney Frishmuth
- Sherry Fry
- Merrell Gage
- Rube Goldberg
- Charles Grafly
- John Gregory
- Walker Hancock
- Oskar J. W. Hansen
- Jonathan Scott Hartley
- Eli Harvey
- Herbert Haseltine
- Carl Augustus Heber
- Henry Hering
- Frederick Hibbard
- Malvina Hoffman
- Milton Horn
- Anna Hyatt Huntington
- C. Paul Jennewein
- Burt Johnson
- Sylvia Shaw Judson
- Charles Keck
- James Kelly
- Henry Hudson Kitson
- Theo Alice Ruggles Kitson
- Charles R. Knight
- Isidore Konti
- Mario Korbel
- Gaston Lachaise
- Albert Laessle
- Lee Lawrie
- William Robinson Leigh
- Leo Lentelli
- Oscar Lenz
- Jacques Lipchitz
- Julius Loester
- Evelyn Beatrice Longman
- Lawrence Monroe Ludtke
- Augustus Lukeman
- Frederick MacMonnies
- Hermon A. MacNeil
- Oronzio Maldarelli
- Paul Manship
- Philip Martiny
- Edward McCartan
- R. Tait McKenzie
- Ivan Meštrović
- Emily Winthrop Miles
- Burr Churchill Miller
- J. Maxwell Miller
- Carl Milles
- Bruce Moore
- Giuseppe Moretti
- Arthur C. Morgan
- Carl Mose
- Samuel Murray
- Reuben Nakian
- Charles Niehaus
- Clark Nobel
- Isamu Noguchi
- Andrew O'Connor
- Francis Packer
- Bashka Paeff
- Edith Parsons
- William Ordway Partridge
- Roland Hinton Perry
- Albin Polasek
- Joseph Pollia
- Bela Pratt
- Alexander Phimister Proctor
- Arthur Putnam
- Edmond Thomas Quinn
- Vinnie Ream
- Frederic Remington
- J. Massey Rhind
- Ulysses Ricci
- Myra Reynolds Richards
- Hugo Robus
- Carlo Romanelli
- Charles Umlauf
- Katharine Lane Weems
- Carel Wirtz
- Mahonri Young

== Partnerships ==
Roman Bronze Works had significant partnerships with the following artists:

- Frederic Remington- Although uncertain, Roman Bronze Works partnership with Frederic Remington is thought to have begun around 1901 with the creation of The Cheyenne. This marked a move from the sand process casts of the Henry-Bonnard Bronze Company to the lost-wax casting method used by Roman Bronze Works. Remington and Bertelli had a close relationship as expressed in Remington's continual presence at the foundry. Remington was often called to examine new models and to retouch the designs when necessary. Roman Bronze Works continued to create works after his death. After his and his wife's death, surmoulages were created using both original bronzes and replicas.
- Charles M. Russell
- Tiffany Studios
