= Sherry Edmundson Fry =

American sculptor

Sherry Edmundson Fry (September 29, 1879 – June 9, 1966) was an American sculptor, who also played a prominent role in U.S. Army camouflage during World War I.

== Early years ==
Fry was born in Creston, Iowa. After completing high school, he enrolled at the Art Institute of Chicago, where he studied sculpture with Lorado Taft. He then moved to Paris, where he attended the Académie Julian and the École des Beaux-Arts, and worked with Frederick MacMonnies, who had been a student of the famous 19th-century American sculptor, Augustus Saint-Gaudens.

Judging from books and articles on American sculpture in the decade prior to World War I, Fry was apparently thought to have been a promising young artist, at a time sometimes referred to as "the golden age of sculpture." Early in his career, he began to receive prestigious awards, including honorable mention at the Paris Salon in 1906, as well as a medal in 1908; the Rome Prize, at the American Academy in Rome in 1908; a silver medal at the Panama–Pacific International Exposition in 1915; and a gold medal at the National Academy of Design in 1917.

== Statue of Mahaska ==
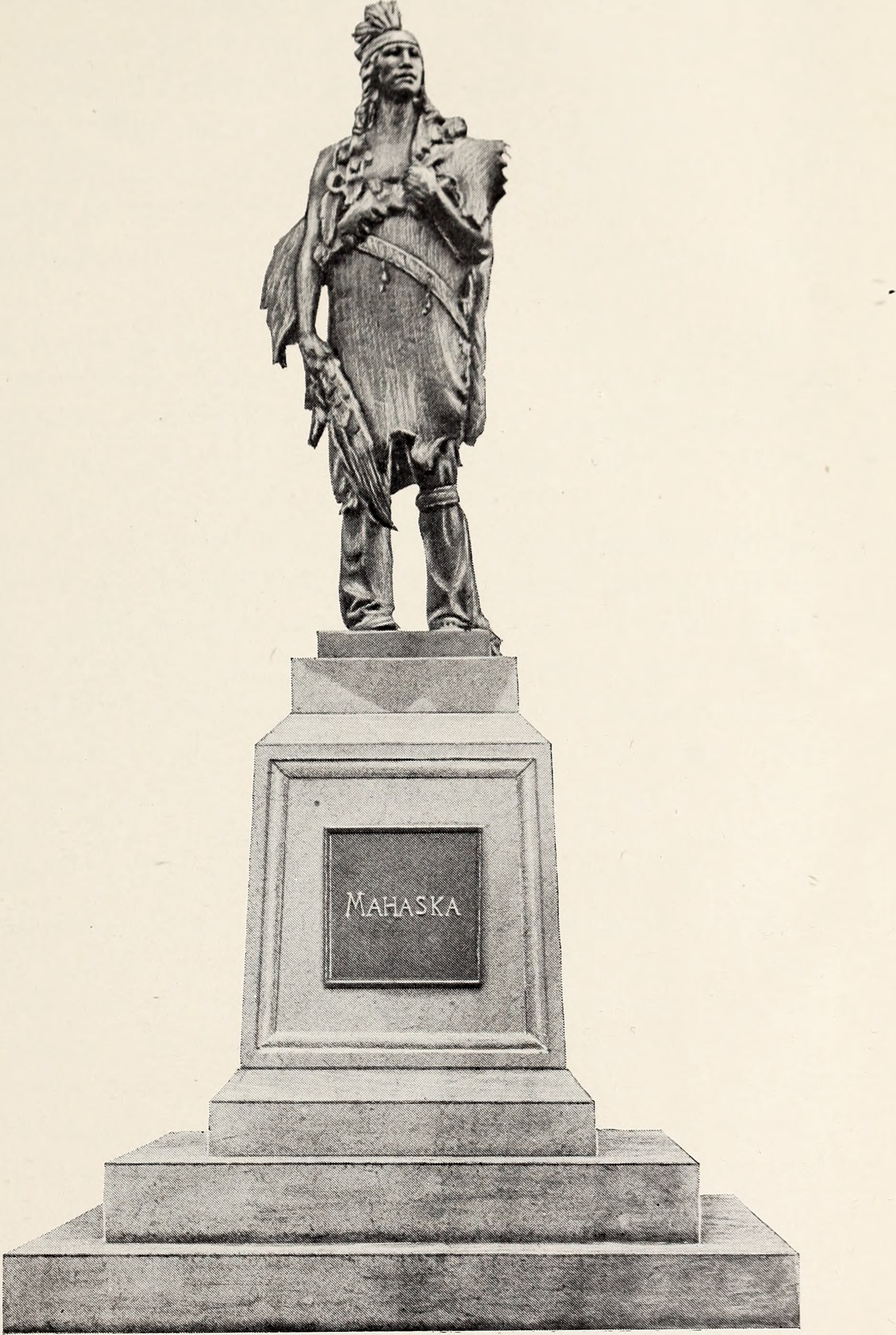
Fry's bronze sculpture of Mahaska

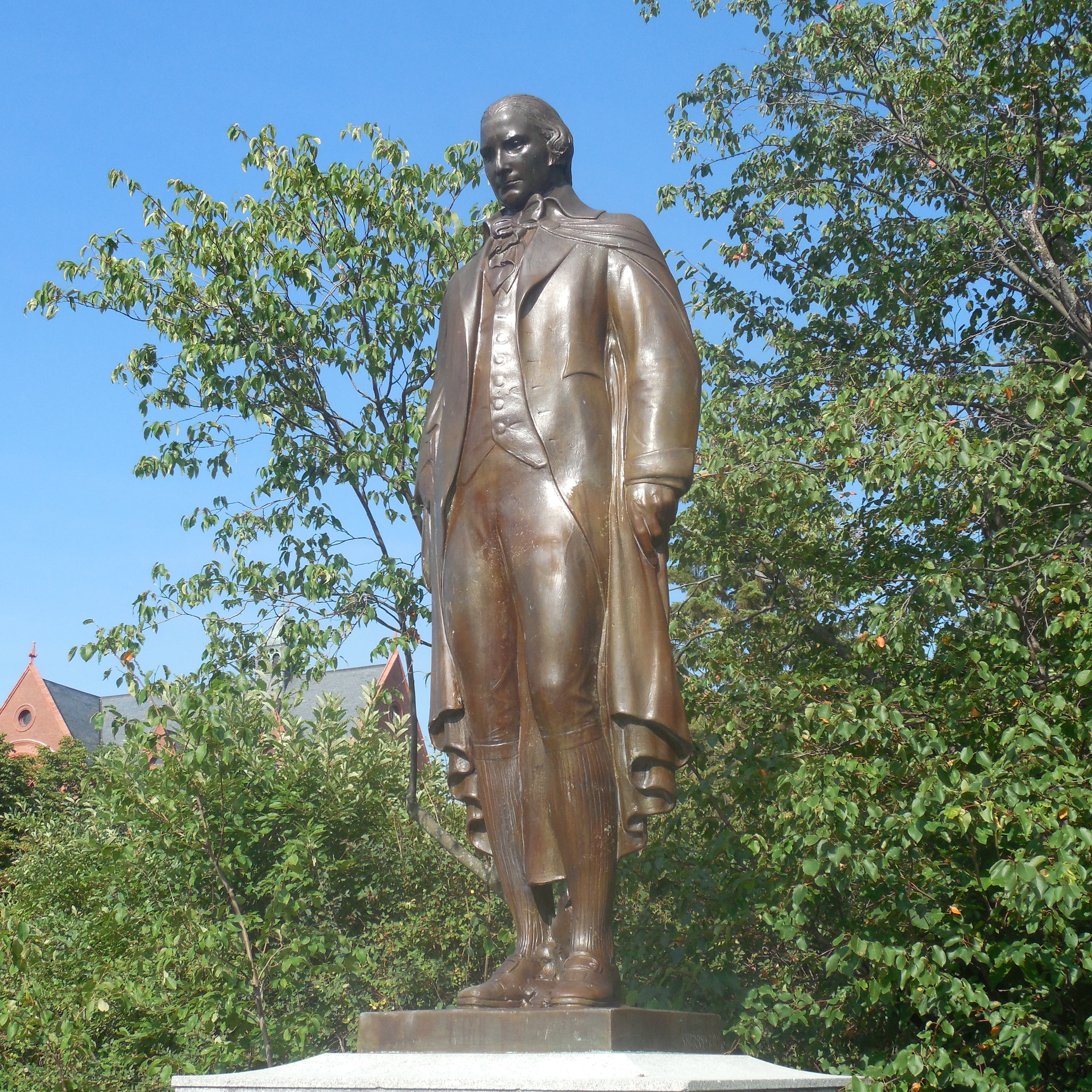
Statue of Ira Allen by Sherry Fry (1921)

As Fry's reputation increased, so did his opportunities for commissioned sculpture, especially commemorative statues, fountains and reliefs. His earliest public commission was a bronze statue of Mahaska, the 19th-century leader of a Native American tribe called the Ioway. Recently restored, it still stands on its pedestal in the town square of Oskaloosa, which is the county seat of Mahaska County, Iowa, in the southeastern section of the state. At the right of the base is the artist's signature "S.E. Fry, 1907".

When he accepted the Mahaska commission in 1906, Fry was living in Paris. He returned to Iowa the following summer to make preparatory drawings of Meskwaki at the nearby Settlement at Tama, Iowa, and to collect Indian artifacts and other reference materials. Returning to Paris, he began on a clay scale model, which he first showed at the Paris Salon in 1907. A year later, he exhibited the final full-sized sculpture, for which he was awarded the Prix de Rome. Soon after, it was shipped to the U.S., and arrived in Oskaloosa by railroad in September. The formal dedication of the statue, which was attended by a crowd of about 12,000 people, was held on May 12, 1909.

== Subsequent commissions ==
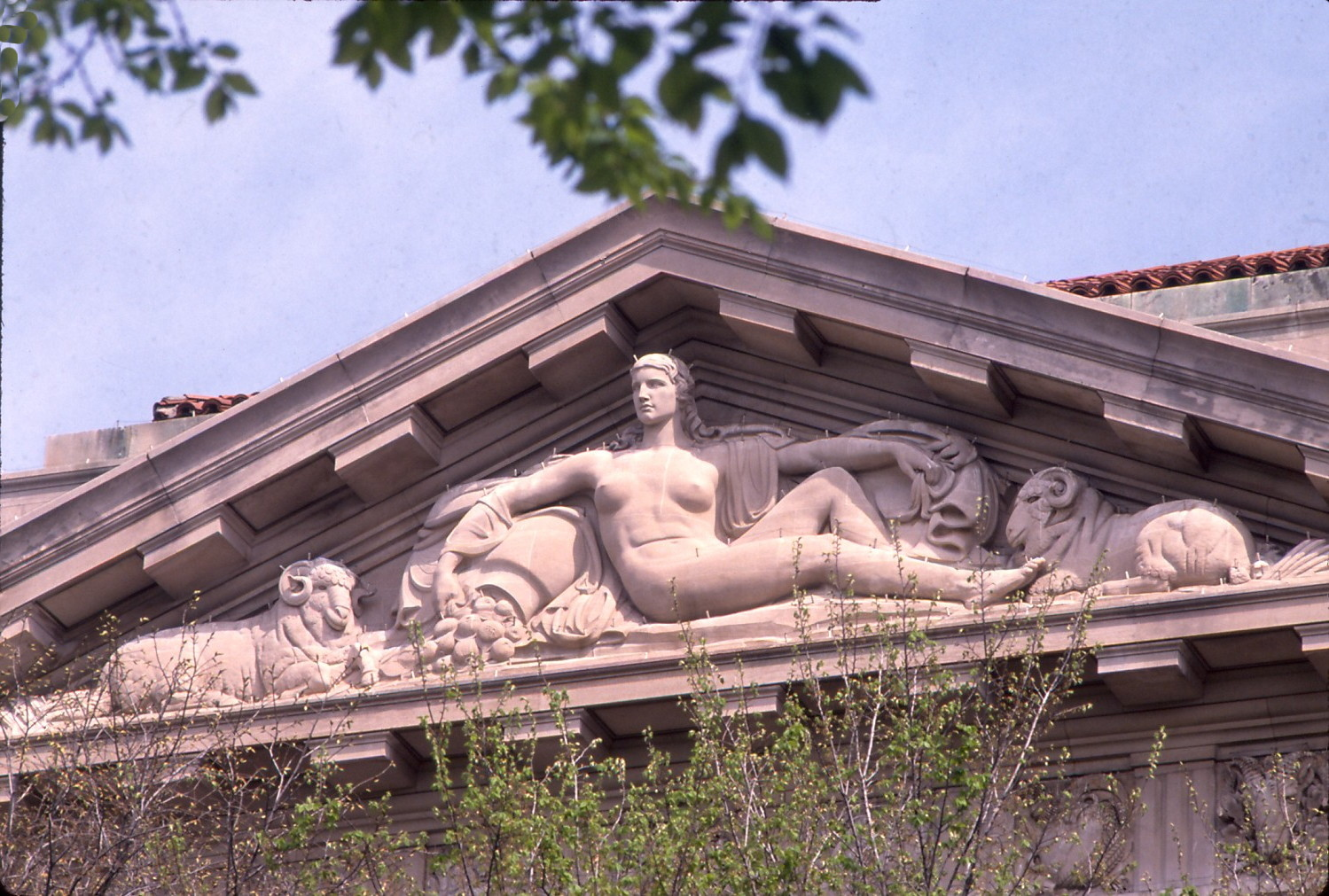
The western pediment, Washington, D.C., 1936

Among Fry's other public works are a pediment for the Frick Museum (New York), reliefs for the Grant Memorial (Washington, D.C.) based on sketches by Henry Merwin Shrady, the fountains at the Toledo Museum of Art (Toledo, Ohio), a statue of Ira Allen at the University of Vermont (Burlington), a memorial to Captain Thomas Abbey (Enfield, Connecticut), and a sculpture of Ceres, the goddess of grain, that stands on the peak of the Missouri State Capitol dome (Jefferson City, Missouri). In addition, a number of Fry's allegorical sculptures were among the artworks featured at the Panama–Pacific International Exposition in San Francisco in 1915. In 1914, he was elected into the National Academy of Design as an Associate member, and became a full Academician in 1930.

== Involvement in camouflage ==
When the U.S. entered World War I in 1917, Fry (who was living in New York by then) saw a news photograph of camouflage created by artists serving in the French Army. He showed it to a friend, New Hampshire painter Barry Faulkner, who was a cousin of Abbott Handerson Thayer (the so-called "father of camouflage"), and a former student of the sculptor Augustus Saint-Gaudens.

By this time, both the French and the British had officially set up units of camouflage specialists called "camoufleurs", many of whom were artists, architects and stage designers. Working together, Fry and Faulkner organized meetings with artists and government officials, in the hope of beginning an American camouflage unit.

Soon after, in 1917, the U.S. Army did set up an American Camouflage Corps (known officially as Company A of the 40th Engineers), and Fry and Faulkner were among the first enlistees. The two men chosen to lead that organization were Homer Saint-Gaudens (son of the celebrated sculptor, and Faulkner's college roommate while at Harvard) and Evarts Tracy, the New York architect who had co-designed the Missouri State Capitol building, and would later hire Sherry Fry to create Ceres for the dome.

This camouflage unit set sail for France on New Year's Day in 1918. A month later, Fry and Faulkner were sent to the front lines, where their primary responsibility was the camouflage of artillery positions. Years later, Faulkner recalled Fry's and his own war experiences in several radio talks and an autobiography. Sherry Fry, said Faulkner, "had little sense of fear and less of discipline." He also "had an insatiable curiosity" and "resented taking orders." He defied regulations and went out alone in abandoned trenches, looking for enemy helmets, belt buckles and other souvenirs. These forays became his chief preoccupation, Faulkner recalled, and before long he was transferred to Chantilly, where because he was fluent in French he became an American liaison to the French camouflage unit.

== Later years ==
In the years following World War I, representational figurative work by sculptors including Fry fell out of favor with the rise in popularity of Modernism. During the later years of his life, he worked out of his studio in Roxbury, Connecticut, where he died in 1966.

== See also ==
- Burnside Fountain

== Sources ==
- Behrens, Roy R. (1996), "Among the Dazzle Painters: Sherry Fry and the Invention of American Camouflage" in Tractor: Iowa Arts and Culture (Fall), pp. 26–28.
- ___ (1997), "Iowa's Contribution to Camouflage" in Iowa Heritage Illustrated (Fall), pp. 98–109.
- ___ (2002), False Colors: Art, Design and Modern Camouflage. Dysart, Iowa: Bobolink Books. ISBN 0-9713244-0-9.
- ___ (2009), Camoupedia: A Compendium of Research on Art, Architecture and Camouflage. Dysart, Iowa: Bobolink Books. ISBN 978-0-9713244-6-6.
- Faulkner, Barry (1973), Sketches from an Artist's Life. Dublin, New Hampshire: William Bauhan.
- Fry, Sherry Edmundson (1917), "An American Corps for Camouflage" in American Architect Vol 112 (July 25), p. 68.
- Rumrill, Alan F. and Carl B. Jacobs, Jr. (2007). Steps to Great Art: Barry Faulkner and the Art of the Muralist. Keene, New Hampshire: Historical Society of Cheshire County. [Includes a sound recording of Faulkner talking about World War I camouflage and other subjects.]
