= Quintet for Strings (Perle) =

The Quintet for Strings (1957–1958) is a composition for two violins, two viola, and one cello by George Perle, "in memory of Laura Slobe". The piece is listed by Richard Swift as a tone-centered composition, rather than as a twelve-tone modal piece or 'freely' composed.

== Structure and analysis ==
The work is structured in four movements:

1. Allegro
2. Scherzo
3. Adagio (Variations)
4. Allegro — molto adagio

The first movement is based primarily upon octatonic and secondarily upon whole tone material, and centered on A♭ (with G and B above). The "sonata-like" first movement also presents material used throughout the work: "a descending scalar melodic line, sustained pedal tones, and melodic thirds." Of the third movement, a theme and four variations, Carl Sigmon writes that, "a declamatory cry dominates the movement – a cry so stark that it must be repeated; there is no answer but itself." Its tone center is G♯, but with A and C♯ above (a whole tone above G and B): "In this fashion, the incipient whole-tone element of the Quintet is embedded in the global tone-center relations." It contains a viola, cello, and violin cadenza in the second, third, and fourth variations, respectively.

It has been recorded on George Perle: A Retrospective (2006) Bridge 9214A/B.
