= Leo Friedlander Studio =

Historic house in New York, United States

- U.S. National Register of Historic Places
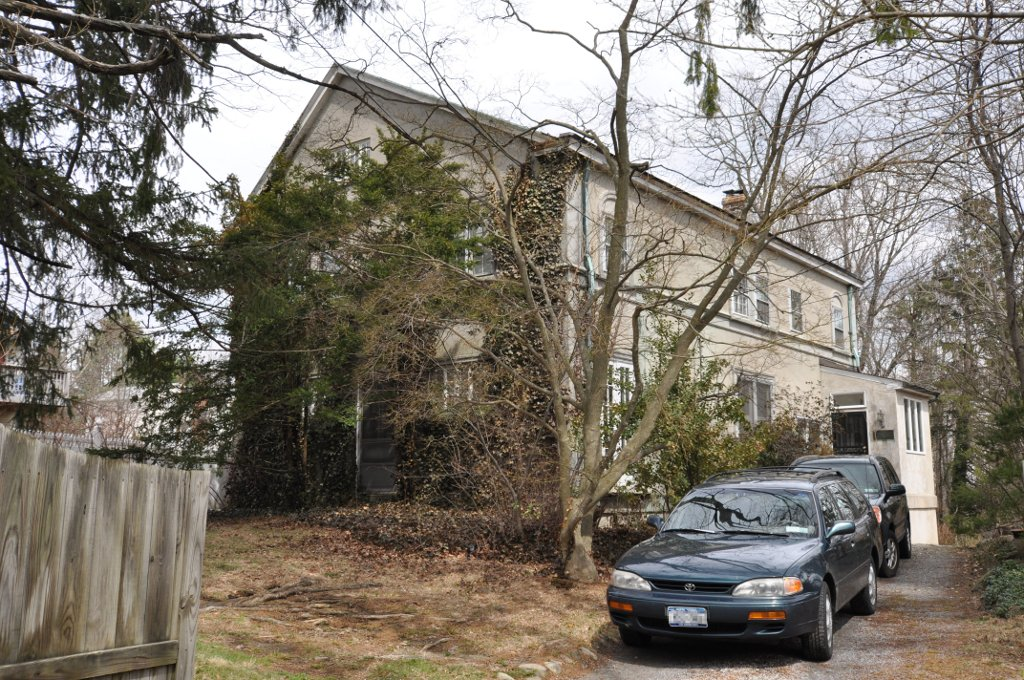

- Location within New York Location within the United States
- Location: 825 W. Hartsdale Rd., Greenburgh, New York
- Coordinates: 41°2′35″N 73°48′34″W
- Area: 1 acre (0.40 ha)
- Built: 1908
- Architect: Bertelli, Roman Bronze Company
- Architectural style: Classical Revival
- NRHP reference No.: 82003416
- Added to NRHP: July 29, 1982

The Leo Friedlander Studio is a historic home and artist's studio located in Greenburgh, Westchester County, New York. It was built in 1908 by the Roman Bronze Works and is a 2 1/2-story building built of concrete block covered in stucco. It features classical style details, a copper-covered gable roof, a bank of skylights, and two brick chimneys. It was originally the home and studio of sculptor Henry Shrady and then Karl Ilava. It was then the residence and studio of Leo Friedlander (1890–1966) from the 1930s until his death.

It was added to the National Register of Historic Places in 1982.

== See also ==
- National Register of Historic Places listings in southern Westchester County, New York
