= Laura Slobe =

American painter (1909–1958)

- Born: November 17, 1909; Pittsburgh, Pennsylvania, U.S.
- Died: January 11, 1958 (aged 48); New York City, U.S.
- Other name: Laura Gray
- Education: School of the Art Institute of Chicago
- Occupations: Painter; sculptor; cartoonist
- Political party: Socialist Workers
- Spouse: George Perle (m. 1940; div. 1952)

Laura Slobe (sometimes credited as Laura Gray; November 17, 1909 – January 11, 1958) was an American painter, sculptor and cartoonist.

== Background ==
Slobe was born in Pittsburgh to a well-to-do Jewish family, and grew up in Chicago, enrolling in the School of the Art Institute of Chicago at 16; by 19 she was exhibiting paintings and winning prizes. She began exhibiting sculpture as well by the late 1930s, and came eventually to be known more as a sculptor than as a painter. In 1939 and 1940 she worked for the Works Progress Administration, creating art and teaching in a number of states, including Oregon. She became acquainted at this point with George Perle, whom she married in 1940; in 1942 the couple joined the Socialist Workers Party, and she took the pseudonym "Laura Gray". She was soon tasked with assisting in the organization of automotive workers, and it was at this time that she began her cartooning career. Encouraged to submit drawings to The Militant, her first appeared in the paper on March 4, 1944; she went on to become the paper's staff artist, submitting at least one cartoon almost weekly for the rest of her life. These drawings, which have been compared to the work of Boardman Robinson, Hugo Gellert, and Robert Minor, would be published in Trotskyist publications around the world. Some of her cartoons on the subject of civil rights would also be published in the African-American press.

Slobe and Perle moved to New York City after World War II, divorcing in 1952 but remaining close. She lived on and off for a time with Duncan Ferguson, and supported herself with a number of odd jobs, devoting less and less of her time to her own art over the years. Always fragile in health – she lived with tuberculosis from early in her life and in 1947 further suffered the removal of a lung – she contracted pneumonia that rapidly turned fatal, killing her at the age of 49. She died in New York City. A sculpture prize was established in her honor at the Art Institute of Chicago after her death, and Perle composed a Quintet for Strings in her memory.

Two sculptures by Slobe are in the collection of the Illinois State Museum; they are Vanity, a plaster of c. 1935, and Venus, a plaster of about the same date. A collection of her cartoons for The Militant is owned by the Tamiment Library and Robert F. Wagner Archives at New York University.
