= Alice Decker =

American sculptor

Alice Decker (September 1, 1901 – 1979) was an American sculptor born in St. Louis, Missouri.

== Early years ==
Decker studied in France with Bourdelle, and Despiau and in New York with direct carver Robert Laurent.

== Later career ==
During the course of 1934 she married Duncan Ferguson. Shortly thereafter she began a three-year affair with critic Lewis Mumford, beginning in 1934, but after a mutual parting they both agreed to destroy their correspondence from during this period, fearing that their respective spouses might learn of their relationship. She later joined a “League Against War, Fascism and Lewis Mumford” with his wife Sophia and another former lover of his, Catherine Bauer. In 1936, after leaving her husband she moved into a house in Greenwich Village with a long, storied history.

During the Great Depression US President Franklin Delano Roosevelt initiated the New Deal. One of its programs was the Federal Art Projects under which the federal government hired artists, mostly painters and sculptors to create art for a variety of public places, often post offices. De Coux carved two reliefs, ""The Oldest Church in the Valley” and Ploughing for the post office in Palmyra, Pennsylvania.

Decker was a founding member of the Sculptors Guild and exhibited at its 1939 1940 and 1941 exhibitions.

Decker was one of the sculptors who exhibited at the 3rd Sculpture International in Philadelphia in 1949.

== Personal life ==
Decker was married twice, from 1934 to 1936 to Duncan Ferguson and to financier Davidson Summers from 1938 until her death in 1979 with whom she had at least one child, Elizabeth Spaulding of Economy, Nova Scotia.

== Work ==
Decker's work can be found:

- Polar Bear, University of Notre Dame, Snite Museum of Art, South Bend, Indiana
- Whom Shall I Fear?, Pennsylvania Academy of the Fine Arts, Philadelphia, Pennsylvania
- Post Office Panels, US Post Office, Palmyra, Pennsylvania
- Penguin and Polar Bear, Wichita Art Museum, Wichita, Kansas
- Sea Breeze, exhibited Sculptors’ Guild Travelling Exhibition 1940-1941
- Reaping, 1941 Outdoor Sculpture Exhibition
- Flight, 1939 SculptorsGuild Outdoor Exhibition
- lewis Mumford’s private collection
