= John Calvin Ferguson =

American art historian

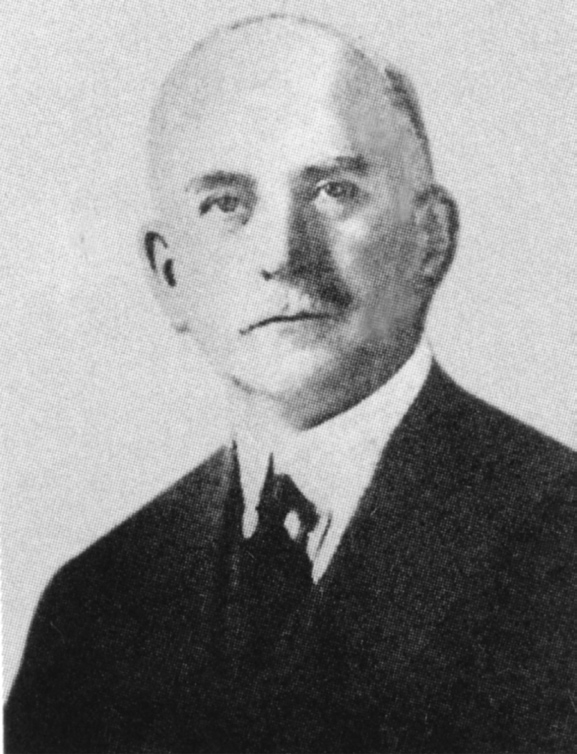
John Calvin Ferguson

John Calvin Ferguson (Chinese: 福開森; pinyin: Fú Kāisēn; March 1, 1866 in Lonsdale, Ontario–1945) was an American scholar of Chinese art, collector and procurer for American art museums, and a Chinese governmental adviser.

Ferguson was the son of John Ferguson and Catherine Matilda Pomeroy (Ferguson). His father was a Methodist minister and his mother a schoolteacher. Ferguson attended Albert College in Ontario, Canada and then Boston University, where he graduated in 1886. He was ordained in the Methodist Episcopal Church and, in 1887, married Mary Elizabeth Wilson.

Their son Douglas Ferguson was a sculptor and political activist. A daughter, Mary, served in the administration of the Peking Union Medical College in the 1930s.

== Career in China ==
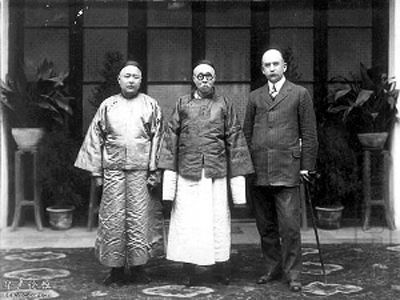
Cai Naihuang and John Calvin Ferguson

Ferguson and his new wife were posted to a Methodist mission in Zhenjiang, Jiangsu, where he took up the serious study of the Chinese language, starting with classical texts, which he then translated into colloquial language to improve his speaking ability. A series of riots in 1891, the low mission salary, and raising five children put extreme stress on his wife.

In 1889, Ferguson used the living room of his house in Nanjing for classes; these grew into Huiwen Shuyuan, which in turn evolved into the University of Nanking. In 1897 he was offered a position by Sheng Xuanhuai, a pioneering industrialist and well-connected entrepreneur whom he had met by chance a few years earlier when they were both on a Yangtze river boat. Sheng was impressed by Ferguson's learned Chinese and courtly manner and invited him to found a second western-style school, the Nanyang Public School, Shanghai, a predecessor of the Jiaotong (Transportation) University, which later split into three independent institutions: National Chiao Tung University, Shanghai Jiao Tong University, and Xi'an Jiaotong University. In 1897, to facilitate faculty and students getting to and from the school, he built a road in the Shanghai French Concession with his own salary, which was later named Route Ferguson (now Wukang Road).

As Sheng became more influential among government modernizing officials, he arranged posts for Ferguson in the Ministry of Commerce, the Imperial Chinese Railway Administration, and the Ministry of Posts and Communications. With Sheng's backing, Ferguson bought the Sin Wan Bao, which became Shanghai's most successful daily newspaper. The newspaper provided Ferguson with a steady income until he sold it several decades later.

In 1902 he returned to Boston University to study for a Ph.D., for which his dissertation was The Confucian Renaissance in the Sung Dynasty. Named honorary secretary of the Royal Asiatic Society (North China branch), he edited their scholarly journal. When Ferguson resigned as president of the Nanyang school, with Sheng Xuanhuai's continuing sponsorship, he became foreign secretary to the Chinese Ministry of Commerce in 1903, and then was official or informal advisor to government bureaus and the chief secretary of the Imperial Chinese Railway Administration until 1907. Taking advantage of his knowledge and connections he began to acquire Chinese art for the Metropolitan Museum of Art in New York. After the fall of the Qing dynasty in 1912, Ferguson was a member of the committee to catalog the imperial palace collections of art.

In 1914, Ferguson returned to the United States to live in Newton, Massachusetts, but in 1915 accepted a position as adviser to Xu Shichang, who soon became president, which required Ferguson to travel back and forth to China. His lectures at the Art Institute of Chicago in 1918 were published as Outlines of Chinese Art. In 1919, his position as adviser led him to establish a permanent home in Beijing. In 1921, he was adviser for the Chinese delegation to the Washington Conference.

His outgoing and friendly character made Ferguson popular, and he served on the editorial committee of the North China Branch of the Royal Asiatic Society and the Royal Asiatic Society, in whose journals he published extensively. Herbert A. Giles, however, was not charmed. Giles, whose reputation as a sinologist was then at its height, published a devastating review, entitled "Another Mistranslator," which included a long list of errors in one of Ferguson's studies and concluded that "Dr. Ferguson should either give up translating Chinese poetry or take a few lessons in the book-language. Ferguson replied in kind:

Dr. Giles has been engaged for so many years in the translation of an immense number of Chinese phrases and occasionally Chinese paragraphs, that he might have been expected to look generously upon the faults of others, when so many of his own have been pointed out to him.... The fellow feeling of fallibility might have expected to produce in an experienced translator some hesitation in calling attention to the faults of others, as long as he could spend his time profitably in revising his own work and correcting his mistakes.

After 1927, with the unification of China under the Kuomintang, he became an adviser to the new government. John Fairbank, who was a student in Beijing in the 1930s, recalls Ferguson as "patriarch of Peking's American community," and a "big man with impressive white hair and mustache." He had a "big house full of servants, with several courtyards and a library plus a curator-teacher," and would supply letters of introduction and firm advice to newcomers.

Ferguson stayed in Beijing even after the outbreak of the Second Sino-Japanese War in 1937. Ferguson spent his internment in a dormitory in the British Embassy, along with the sinologist and accused forger Edmund Backhouse. In 1943 he was exchanged, along with his daughter Mary. But the arduous voyage to New York by way of Southeast Asia and South America exhausted him. He died in a sanitarium in Clifton Springs, New York, in 1945.

== Collector and historian of Chinese art ==
In 1912, the trustees of the Metropolitan Museum in New York requested Ferguson to secure "representative specimens" of Chinese art and supplied him with $25,000. Ferguson assembled an impressive collection of paintings, many from the Qing imperial clan, especially the Manchu prince Duanfang, as well as examples of early bronzes, which, although in later years highly prized, the Trustees of the Metropolitan Museum thought should be housed in an archeological museum, not one of fine arts. The trustees were eager to match or surpass the Asian collection at the Boston Museum of Fine Arts, which had been largely assembled by Ernest Fenollosa. Fenollosa, like Ferguson in China, had risen to a position of influence in Japan, but his tastes in Chinese art had been formed by Japanese critics. When the first group of Ferguson's paintings arrived in New York, the trustees turned to a friend of Fenollosa's, who found them "rather disappointing" and challenged the authenticity or dating of some. When a group was put on exhibition, a newspaper reviewer was surprised that "real money was paid" for the paintings. Ferguson stoutly defended the paintings and offered to buy back any that the museum found wanting. The Museum asked the opinion of Charles Lang Freer, whose collection would form the core of the Freer Gallery in Washington, D.C. Freer defended Ferguson and most of the paintings, pointing out that art dealers were trying to discredit Ferguson. When the Metropolitan Museum said that it would not pay even ten dollars for Nymph of the Luo River, Freer quickly bought it for his own collection, Ferguson arranged the sale of several other highly important works to Freer.

Ferguson's two pioneering indexes of writings on Chinese art, one for paintings and one for bronzes, were basic references for the next generation of scholars. The catalog on paintings, commonly known as "Ferguson's Index," was published at Nanking University in 1934, when Ferguson was sixty-eight years old. and the catalog of writings on bronzes by the Commercial Press in Shanghai in 1939, when he was seventy-three. These volumes indexed references in Chinese catalogs and other writings, in the case of painters, to 2,391 artists based on 108 titles. They drew on Ferguson's own library, art collection, and extensive notes he had made going back to the 1890s, but the work of indexing in Chinese and further work was done by Chinese collaborators. In order to avoid the mistakes that might have been introduced if they copied the entries by hand, they cut entries out of the original volumes and pasted them onto sheets in chronological order and by name of the artist to make a manuscript for the printer. These volumes were unsystematic in the works they had access to and haphazard in their organization, but they made it possible to know the range and nature of Chinese art at a time when most of the important pieces were emerging from imperial or private collections which had not been available to the public or scholars.

Ferguson donated many pieces to the Metropolitan Museum of Art, but the bulk of his own collection, including bronzes, scrolls, paintings, and jades, was donated to Nanjing University in 1935, and other major gifts were made which are now in the collections of Shanghai Jiao Tong University.

Thomas Lawton, Senior Research Scholar at the Freer Gallery, concludes that Ferguson made errors which in light of later scholarship seem "naive and inexplicable," but "more significant than his mistakes are his remarkable contributions" and that "anyone who studies Chinese art and culture today quickly becomes aware of a profound debt" owed to him. The historian Warren Cohen concludes that Freer and Ferguson were primarily responsible for the "golden age" of East Asian art collecting. Freer's money and taste combined with Ferguson's connections and connoisseurship to make it possible for the American public to see and for American scholars to study a much wider and more representative body of art, and led directly to a shift in American taste away from decorative and ornate works.

== Major works ==
- Catalogue, Special exhibition of Chinese paintings from the collection of the Museum. New York: Metropolitan Museum of Art, 1914. Free copy Internet Archive
- Outlines of Chinese art. Scammon Lectures for 1918 (Chicago: Published for the Art Institute of Chicago by the University of Chicago Press, 1919). Free copy Internet Archive.
- Chinese Painting. Chicago: University of Chicago Press, 1927.
- Li Dai Zhu Lu Hua Mu 歷代著錄畫目. Nanking: University of Nanking.
- Li Dai Zhu Lu Ji Jin Mu 歷代著錄集金目. Shanghai: Commercial Press.
- Survey of Chinese art. Shanghai: Commercial Press, 1939.
