= Duncan Ferguson (political activist) =

American sculptor and activist (1901–1974)

Duncan Ferguson (January 1, 1901 – April 29, 1974) was an American sculptor and political activist.

== Childhood and education ==
His father, John Calvin Ferguson (1866–1945) had taken a degree in theology from Boston University before he went to China in 1887 on behalf of the Methodist Episcopal Church to establish the University of Nanking and became its first president. John Calvin Ferguson became an expert on Chinese art, and the owner and publisher of two Shanghai newspapers, Sin Wan Pao and The Shanghai Times, while his career extended into the area of Chinese government service. From 1907 Ferguson and his seven siblings divided their time between China and Newton, Massachusetts. Duncan Ferguson was educated at colleges in Rhode Island and Massachusetts. He did some studies in economics and English literature at Harvard University.

== First marriage ==
Ferguson left Brown University where he had received a teaching appointment in the English Department and instead took a position in Harvard's Fine Arts Department. Around this time Ferguson married Mary Manley; they separated in 1926, and later divorced.

== Museum exhibits ==
Following a psychological crisis (in 1924 he attempted suicide and was hospitalized; in his later life he sometimes would exhibit suicidal behaviour and threaten suicide) he eventually became established as a sculptor of distinction, creating a large number of works of sculpture always remarkable for their classical serenity and great individuality. He settled in New York and his works were displayed at the Brooklyn Museum, the Museum of Modern Art, and the Whitney Museum, among other venues. In 1929, a one-man art show at Halpert's Downtown Gallery marked the zenith of his New York period.

In 1931 he married his second wife, Alice Decker; this marriage, however, ended when she left him in 1936. In the mid-1930s, he began an academic career joining Louisiana State University, becoming instructor first, then assistant professor (sculpture, wood carving, stone cutting). At that time he also received a series of commissions occupying him with architectural sculpture such as reliefs.

== Political radicalization ==
In 1939, he underwent some fundamental transformations in political thinking, social behaviour and personal habits. He became radicalized and labelled himself a Trotskyist. Ferguson would go on to translate, among other writings, Trotsky's Nationalized Industry and Workers' Management (written in 1938). He left New Orleans, where he had married his third wife, Demila Sanders, and moved to Gambier, Ohio. At the end of 1941 Demila went to New York, shortly thereafter Ferguson arrived there, and they took a loft on West 21st Street in Manhattan, New York. Demila and Duncan Ferguson met with such Socialist Workers Party (SWP) leaders as James Cannon, Albert Goldman and Felix Morrow. After having rejected the offer to become chairman of the Arts Department of Queens College, he found employment at the Crucible Steel plant where he worked as a lathe operator. He became a union shop steward and a delegate to the SWP's national conventions.

In January 1944 the Fergusons went to Mexico on behalf of the SWP in order to care for Leon Trotsky's widow, Natalia Sedova, who continued to live in the house Coyoacán, a suburb of Mexico City, where Trotsky had been assassinated in August 1940. Demila complained about the conditions in Mexico and left at the end of 1944; Ferguson followed her to New York. For many years he was an active SWP member, writing articles under pseudonyms and doing translations from French language material. In the 1940s he was a member of the National Committee of the Civil Rights Committee, for several years he ran Pioneer Publishers (the SWP publishing house) and from 1956 to 1958 he was managing editor of the International Socialist Review, the theoretical journal of the SWP. Later he was a member of the National Control Commission of the SWP.

Among the few pieces of sculpture which Ferguson completed after becoming chiefly a party worker, were busts of Trotsky and James P. Cannon. Demila ultimately left her husband and, after a period of depression, Ferguson began an affair with Laura Slobe, an artist and member of the SWP. Their affair ended after a few years and she died in 1958. By the mid-1950s Ferguson's health worsened, so that he had to abandon his job and live off dividends from stock left to him by his father, who had died in 1945.

== Last marriage ==
He remarried, this time to Cleo Bell, a ceramist, and became committed to making some artistic comeback. In the meanwhile he had settled in Cleveland where he advanced to a new and final stage in his effort to unify his political and artistic lives. Troubles in his personal life continued and his relationship with Cleo also ended in divorce.

== Last years and death ==
In the 1960s he suffered a large stroke followed by some small ones, causing severe neurological problems. He spent his last years of life partly in Cleveland, partly in Southern California.

In 1973 he discovered that he had advanced cancer. He went to California for treatment. He slipped into a coma and died in a nursing home at Santa Monica, California on April 29, 1974, aged 73.

Ferguson's papers are kept at the Archives of American Art of the Smithsonian Institution.
