= Bust of Ulysses S. Grant (San Francisco) =

Bust of Ulysses S. Grant in Golden Gate Park, San Francisco, California, U.S.

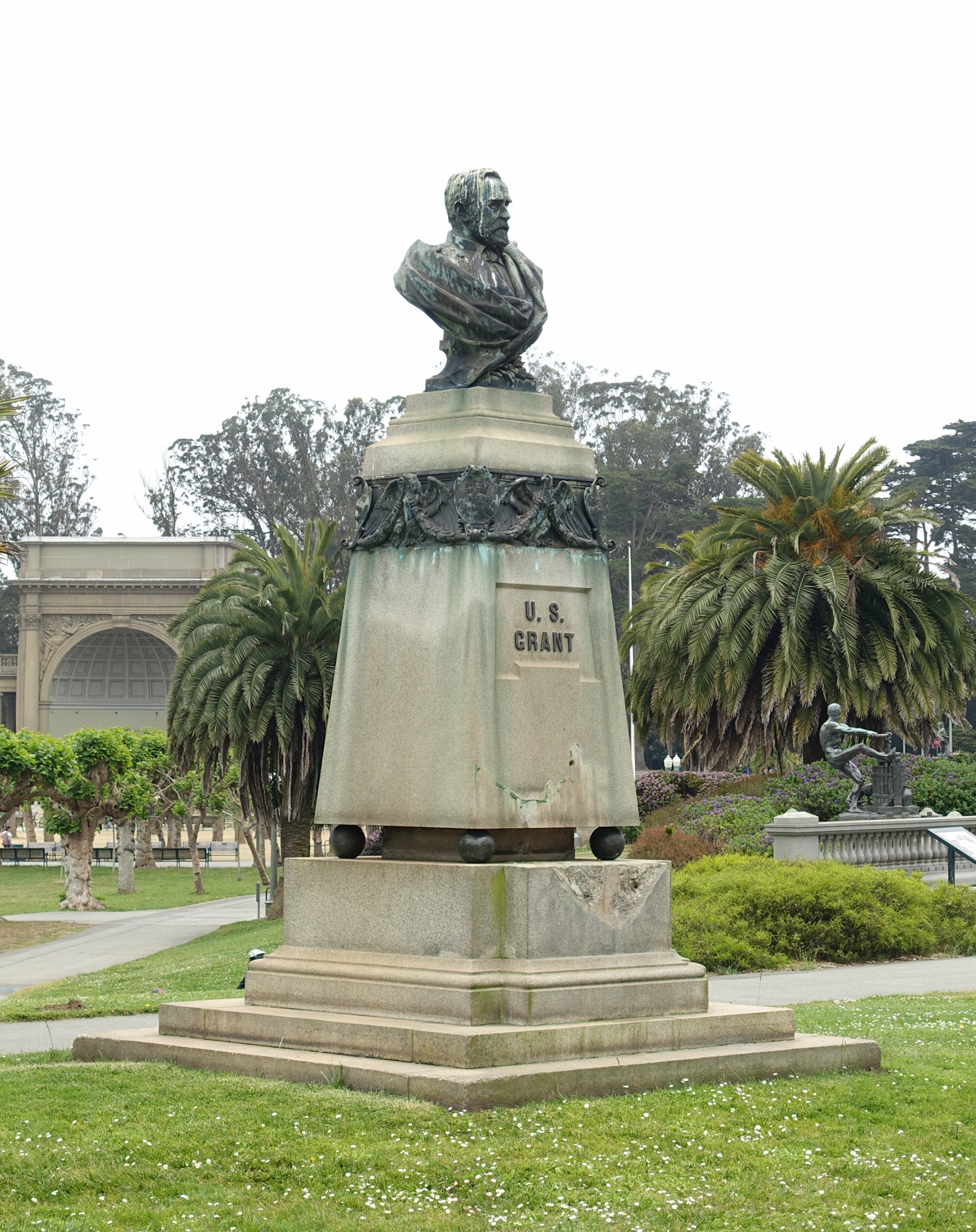
- The monument in 2015
- Year: 1896
- Subject: Ulysses S. Grant
- Location: San Francisco, California, U.S.; 37.77167°N 122.46693°W

A bronze bust of Ulysses S. Grant was installed in San Francisco's Golden Gate Park, in the U.S. state of California, in 1896 and vandalised and removed in 2020. The original sculptor of the bust was a renowned German born sculptor by the name of Rupert Schmid who had been noted for his commissioned work including The Progress of Civilization, a memorial arch at Stanford University before it was toppled in an earthquake in 1906.

== History ==
Grant was stationed in northern California in 1852–1854. After Grant's death in 1885, a committee was formed to create a monument in his honor. Rupert Schmid, a German-born immigrant to the United States who had met Grant and had sculpted the bust for Grant's Tomb, was commissioned in 1894 to create a bust. The bust was completed and installed in 1896. Under pressure from the local stonecutters' union, which objected to the use of prison labor in the cutting of the granite base of the statue, the statue was taken down days after its initial installation, and reinstalled with a new base later the same year.

On June 19, 2020, the monument was toppled by protestors and defaced with the words "Adios America" in red paint as a response to Grant's brief ownership of a slave. Historian Gregory Downs, noting Grant's enforcement of civil rights and prosecution of the Ku Klux Klan, opined, "When the mob members tore down Grant's bust, they unknowingly built upon a 150-year effort to erase and defame him."
