= Statue of Ulysses S. Grant (U.S. Capitol) =

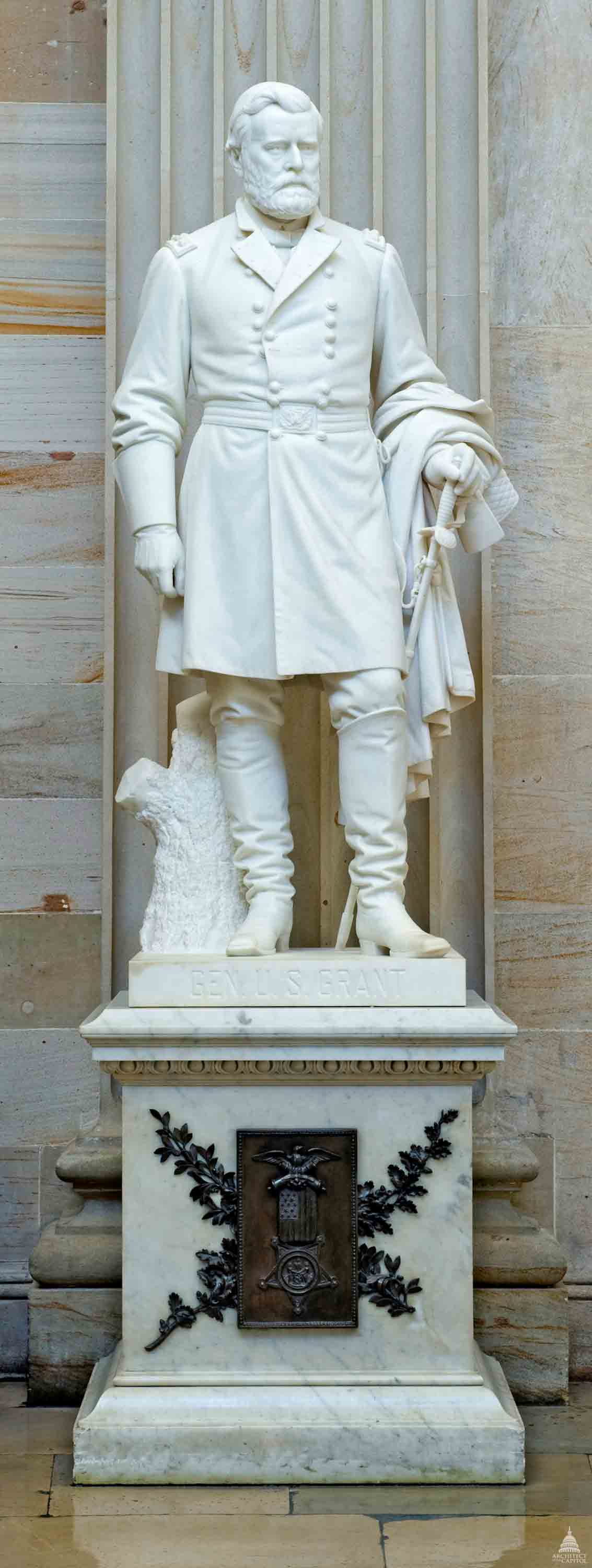
- The statue in 2011
- Subject: Ulysses S. Grant
- Location: Washington, D.C., U.S.

A 1899 marble sculpture of Ulysses S. Grant by Franklin Simmons is installed in the United States Capitol's rotunda, in Washington, D.C.

== See also ==
- Ulysses S. Grant Memorial on Capitol Hill
- List of sculptures of presidents of the United States
