= George Perle =

American composer

- Perle in 1991
- Born: 6 May 1915; Bayonne, New Jersey, United States
- Died: 23 January 2009 (aged 93); New York City, US
- Occupations: Composer, music theorist
- Spouse: Shirley Xenia Gabis
- Website: georgeperle.net

George Perle (6 May 1915 – 23 January 2009) was an American composer and music theorist. As a composer, his music was largely atonal, using methods similar to the twelve-tone technique of the Second Viennese School. This serialist style, and atonality in general, was the subject of much of his theoretical writings. His 1962 book, Serial Composition and Atonality: An Introduction to the Music of Schoenberg, Berg, and Webern remains a standard text for 20th-century classical music theory. Among Perle's awards was the 1986 Pulitzer Prize for Music for his Wind Quintet No. 4.

== Life and career ==
Perle was born in Bayonne, New Jersey, to Russian Jewish parents. He graduated from DePaul University, where he studied with Wesley LaViolette and received private lessons from Ernst Krenek. Later, he served as a technician fifth grade in the United States Army during World War II. He earned his doctorate at New York University in 1956.

Perle composed with a technique of his own devising called "twelve-tone tonality". This technique was different from, but related to, the twelve-tone technique of the Second Viennese School, of which he was an "early admirer" and whose techniques he used aspects of but never fully adopted. Perle's former student Paul Lansky described Perle's twelve-tone tonality thus:

Basically this creates a hierarchy among the notes of the chromatic scale so that they are all referentially related to one or two pitches which then function as a tonic note or chord in tonality. The system similarly creates a hierarchy among intervals and finally, among larger collections of notes, 'chords.' The main debt of this system to the 12-tone system lies in its use of an ordered linear succession in the same way that a 12-tone set does".

In 1968, Perle cofounded the Alban Berg Society with Igor Stravinsky, and Hans F. Redlich, who had the idea (according to Perle in his letter to Glen Flax of 4/1/89). Perle's important work on Berg includes documenting that the third act of Lulu, rather than being an unfinished sketch, was actually three-fifths complete and that the Lyric Suite contains a secret program dedicated to Berg's love-affair.

After retiring from Queens College in 1985, he became a professor emeritus at the Aaron Copland School of Music. In 1986, Perle was awarded a Pulitzer Prize for Music for his Wind Quintet No. 4 and also a MacArthur Fellowship. In about 1989 Perle became composer-in-residence for the San Francisco Symphony, a three-year appointment. It was also around this time that he had published his fourth book entitled The Listening Composer.

He died aged 93 in his home in New York City in January 2009. He was buried in Calverton National Cemetery.

In the run-up to his 100th birthday celebrations the composer-pianist Michael Stephen Brown released a well received CD of a sampling of Perle's work for piano.

Perle was married to the sculptor Laura Slobe from 1940 to 1952; the couple were members of the Socialist Workers Party. His second wife, Barbara Philips, died in 1978. Perle married Shirley Xenia Gabis in 1982.

== Works ==
Richard Swift differentiates between Perle's 'free' or 'intuitive', tone-centered, and twelve-tone modal music. He lists Perle's tone-centered compositions:

- Sonata for Solo Viola (1942)
- Three Sonatas for Solo Clarinet (1943)
- Hebrew Melodies for Solo Cello (1945)
- Sonata for Solo Cello (1947)
- Quintet for Strings (1958)
- Sonata I for Solo Violin (1959)
- Wind Quintet I (1959)
- Wind Quintet II (1960)
- Monody I for Flute (1962)
- Monody II for Double Bass (1962)
- Three Inventions for Bassoon (1962)
- Sonata II for Solo Piano (1963)
- Solo Partita for Violin and Viola (1965)
- Wind Quintet III (1967)

== Selected publications ==
- Perle, George (1962, reprint 1991). Serial Composition and Atonality: An Introduction to the Music of Schoenberg, Berg, and Webern. University of California Press.
- Perle, George (1992) [1978]. Twelve-Tone Tonality. University of California Press.
- Perle, George (1980). The Operas of Alban Berg. Vol. 1: Wozzeck. California: University of California Press.
- Perle, George (1984). "Scriabin's Self-Analysis", Musical Analysis III/2 (July).
- Perle, George (1985). The Operas of Alban Berg. Vol. 2: Lulu. California: University of California Press.
- Perle, George (1990). The Listening Composer. California: University of California Press.
- Perle, George (1992). "Symmetry, the Twelve-Tone Scale, and Tonality", Contemporary Music Review 6 (2), pp. 81–96.
