= Wind Quintet No. 4 (Perle) =

Wind Quintet IV (1984–85) is George Perle's fourth wind quintet. He was awarded the 1986 Pulitzer Prize for Music for the piece.

It was commissioned by the Dorian Wind Quintet, who gave the first performance of the work at Merkin Concert Hall on October 2, 1985.

== Structure ==
The work is in four movements:

1. Invention
2. Scherzo
3. Pastorale
4. Finale
