= Henry Shrady =

American sculptor

Henry Merwin Shrady
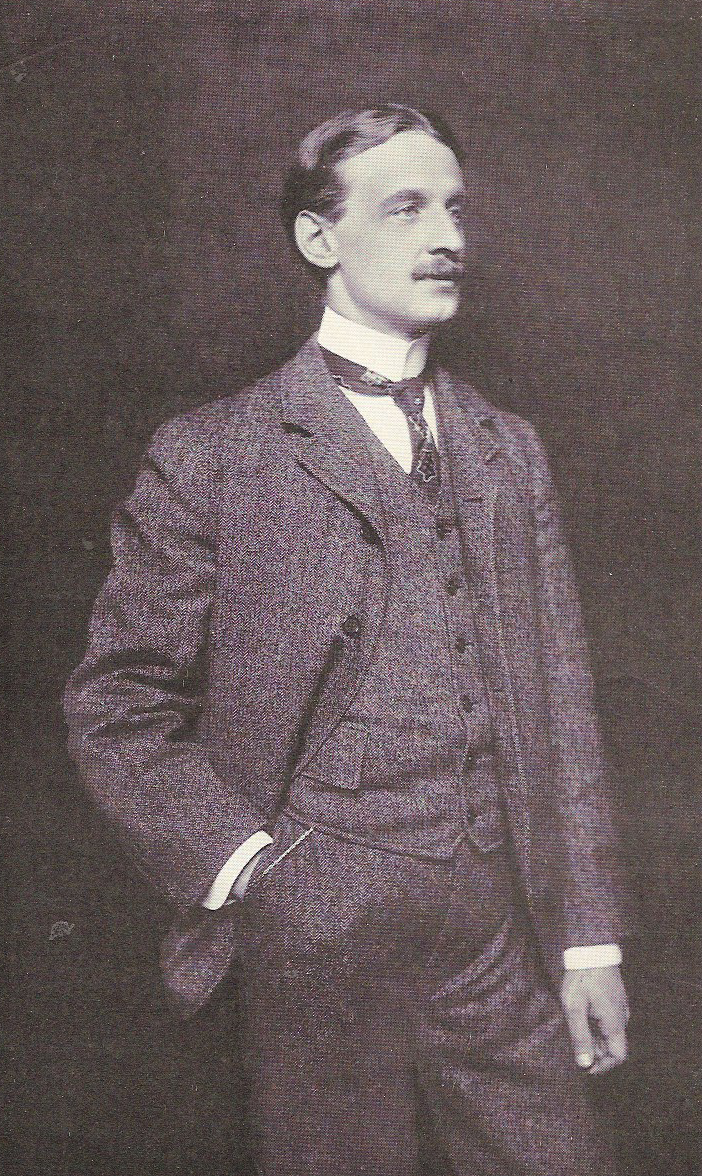
- Born: October 12, 1871; New York City
- Died: April 12, 1922 (aged 50); New York City
- Education: Columbia University (BA)
- Occupation: Sculptor
- Notable work: Ulysses S. Grant Memorial; Robert E. Lee Monument
- Spouse: Harrie Moore
- Children: Frederick Charles Shrady
- Parents: George Frederick Shrady, Sr. (father); Mary Lewis (mother)

Henry Merwin Shrady (October 12, 1871 – April 12, 1922) was an American sculptor, best known for the Ulysses S. Grant Memorial on the west front of the United States Capitol in Washington, D.C.

== Background ==
Shrady was born in New York City. His father, George Frederick Shrady, Sr., was one of the physicians who attended Ulysses S. Grant during the former president's struggle with throat cancer.

In 1894, Shrady graduated from Columbia University, where he was a member of the Varsity Show, and then spent one year at Columbia's law school. He left law school to join with his brother-in-law, Edwin Gould (son of the financier Jay Gould), at the Continental Match Company. The company failed, and Shrady contracted typhoid fever, which diverted him forever from the business world. His recuperation left spare time to pursue a growing interest in art.

Shrady's wife, Harrie Moore, submitted some of his paintings to an exhibition of the National Academy of Design without his knowledge, and they sold quickly. He then began to teach himself sculpture using zoo animals and his pets as models.

He modeled a series of popular bronze statuettes, mostly of animals. His first major commission came in 1901, for George Washington at Valley Forge, an equestrian statue for Continental Army Plaza in Brooklyn, New York.

== Grant Memorial ==
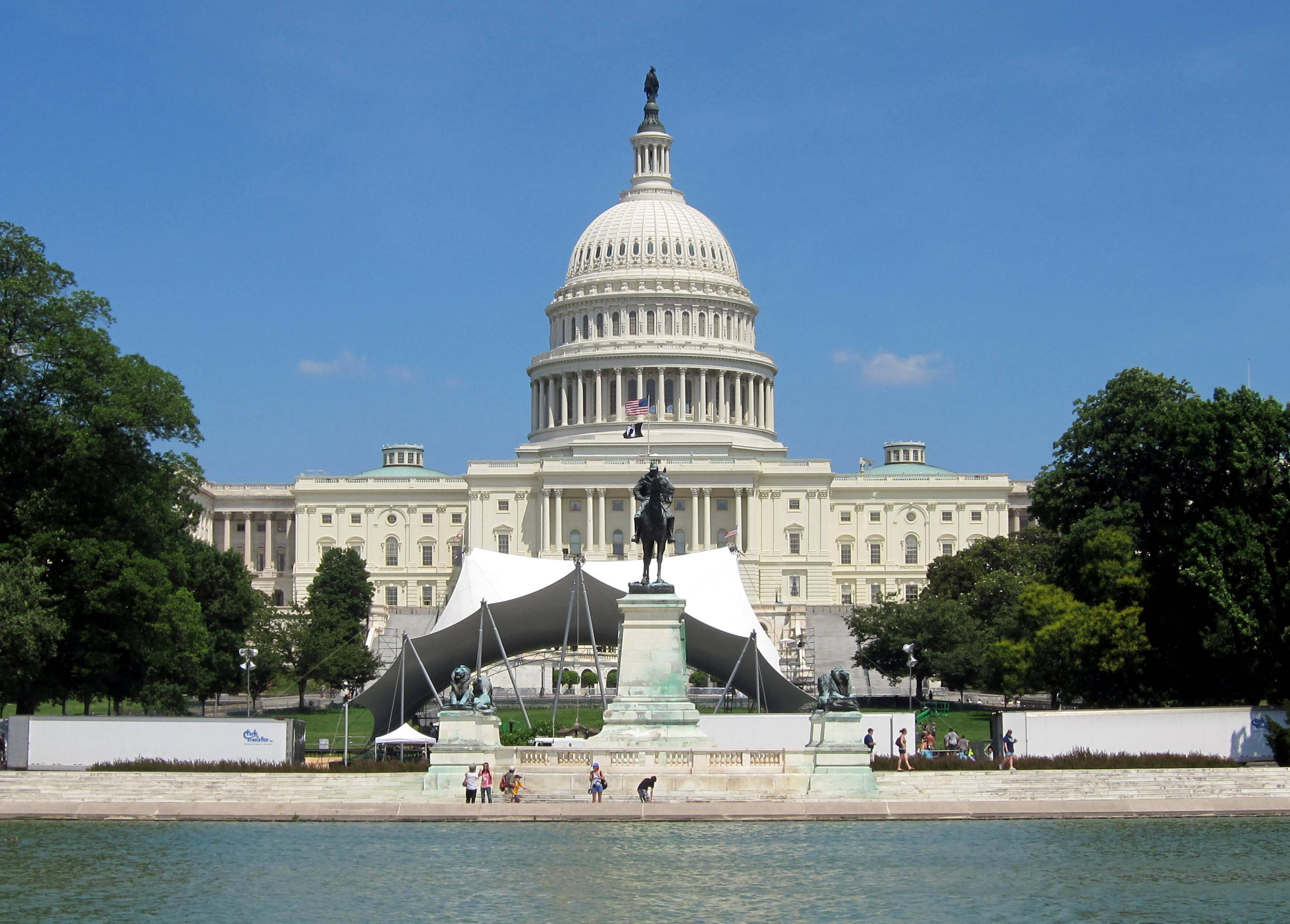
Grant Memorial (1902-1922), United States Capitol, Washington, DC.

Shrady and architect Edward Pearce Casey won the competition to build the Ulysses S. Grant Memorial in 1902. In the twenty years Shrady spent executing its sculpture program, he studied biology at the American Museum of Natural History and dissected horses to gain a better understanding of animal anatomy. The memorial was dedicated on April 27, 1922, two weeks after Shrady's death.

The Grant Memorial is described as "one of the most important sculptures in Washington" by James M. Goode in The Outdoor Sculpture of Washington, D.C. It consists of a colossal equestrian statue of Grant atop a marble pedestal with bas relief plaques, guarded by four lions. Large sculpture groups of the Cavalry and Artillery flank this to the north and south, with a reflecting pool to the west.

== Legacy ==
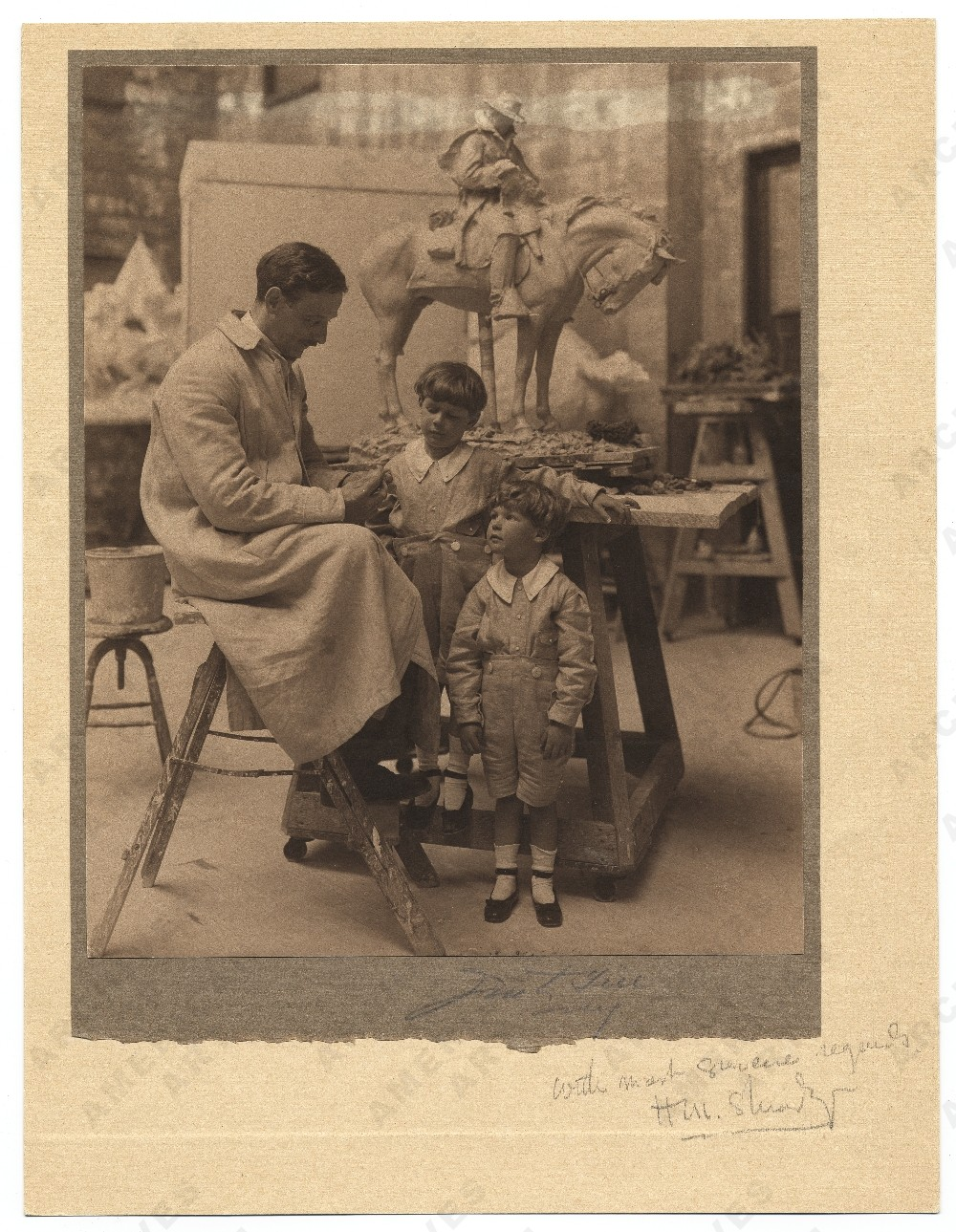
Shrady in his studio with sons Frederick and Lewis, circa 1911. His model for General Alpheus S. Williams is in the background.

In 1908, the Roman Bronze Works built a home and studio for Shrady at White Plains, New York. It was added to the National Register of Historic Places in 1982 as the Leo Friedlander Studio.

Shrady's papers are in the Archives of American Art at the Smithsonian Institution.

His son, Frederick Charles Shrady (1907–1990), became a sculptor.

A collaborative bronze statue by Shrady and Lentelli was destroyed by the Jefferson School African American Heritage Center, which melted the statue in 2023.

== Selected works ==
=== Statuettes ===
- Bull Moose (1900)
- Empty Saddle (1900)
- Saving the Colors (c. 1900)
- Elk Buffalo ("Monarch of the Plains") (1901)
- Buffalo (1903)
- Fighting Buffalo (1903)
- Cavalry Charge (1902–1916, cast 1924), Metropolitan Museum of Art, New York City. This is a miniature version of the sculpture group from the Grant Memorial.

=== Sculptures ===
- George Washington at Valley Forge (1901–1906), Continental Army Plaza, Brooklyn, New York.
  - A 1925 replica is in Washington Square Park, Kansas City, Missouri.
- Ulysses S. Grant Memorial (1902–1922), West Front, United States Capitol, Washington D.C.
- General Alpheus S. Williams Memorial (1912–1921), Belle Isle Park, Detroit, Michigan.
- Jay Cooke Monument (1921), Jay Cooke Plaza, Duluth, Minnesota.

=== Destroyed ===
- Robert Edward Lee Sculpture (1917–1924), Lee Park, Charlottesville, Virginia. Completed by Leo Lentelli following Shrady's 1922 death. Removed in 2021 and destroyed by melting in 2023.

== Gallery ==
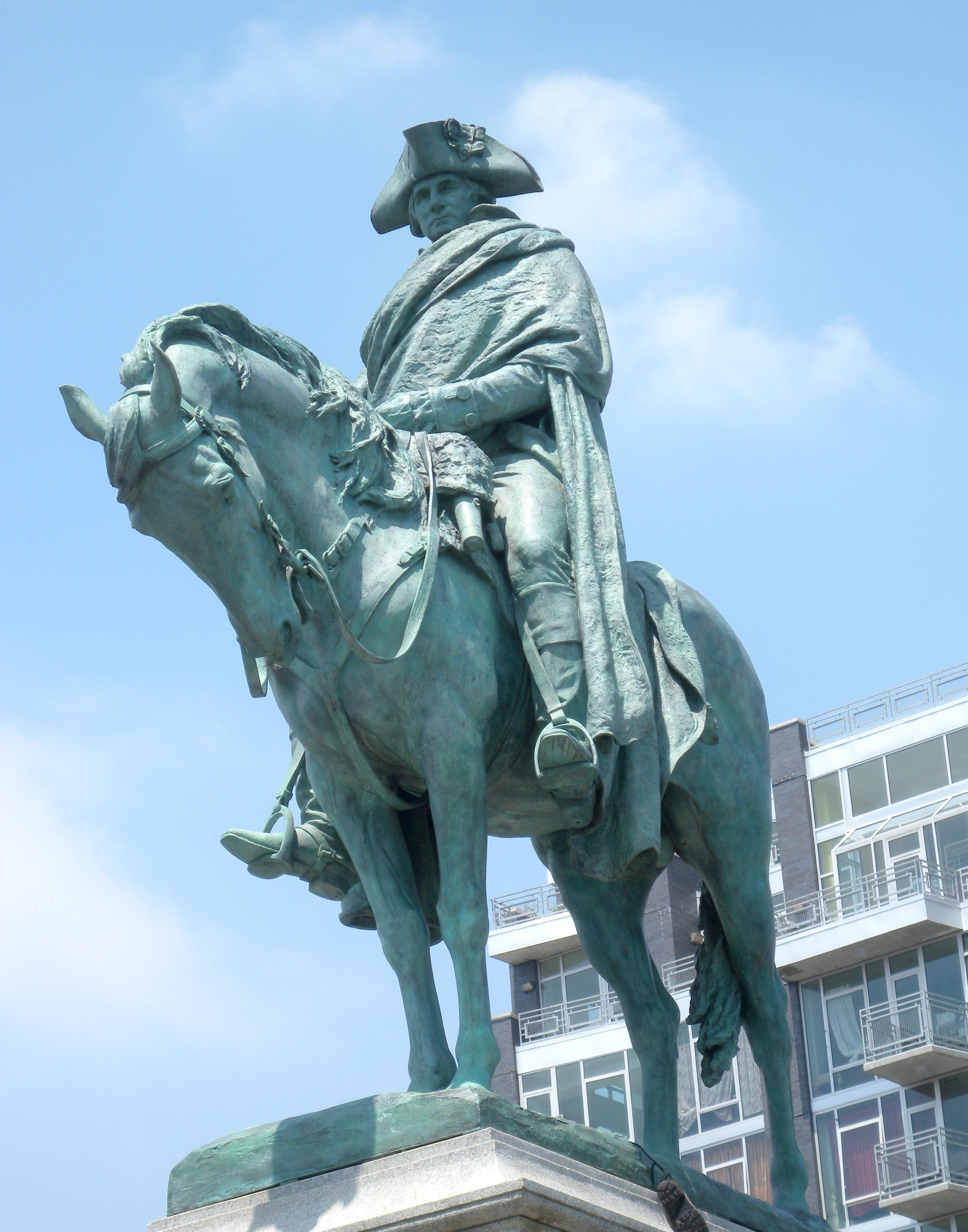
George Washington at Valley Forge (1901–1906), Continental Army Plaza, Brooklyn, New York.

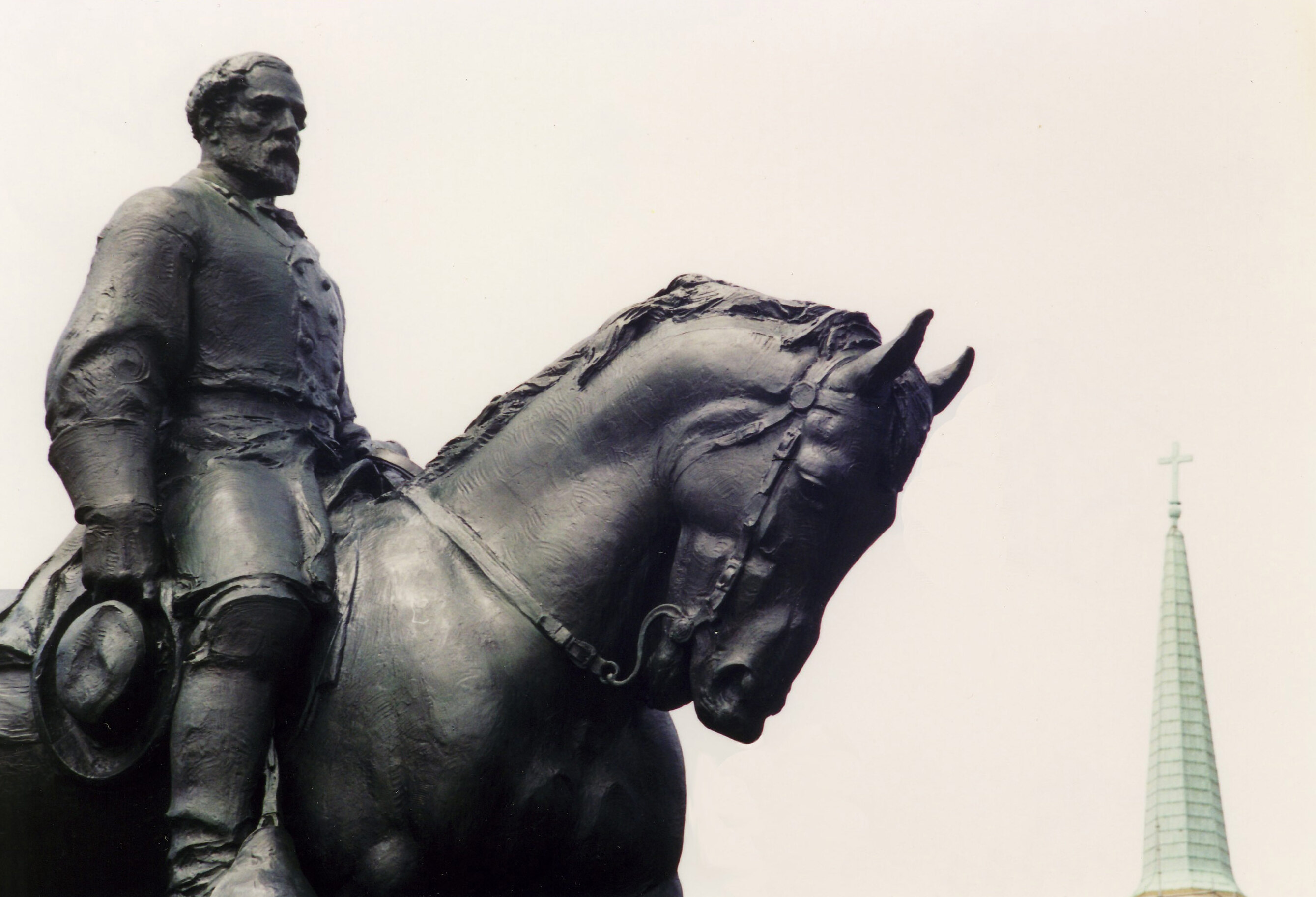
Robert E. Lee (1917–1924, completed by Leo Lentelli), Lee Park, Charlottesville, Virginia, before its removal and destruction.

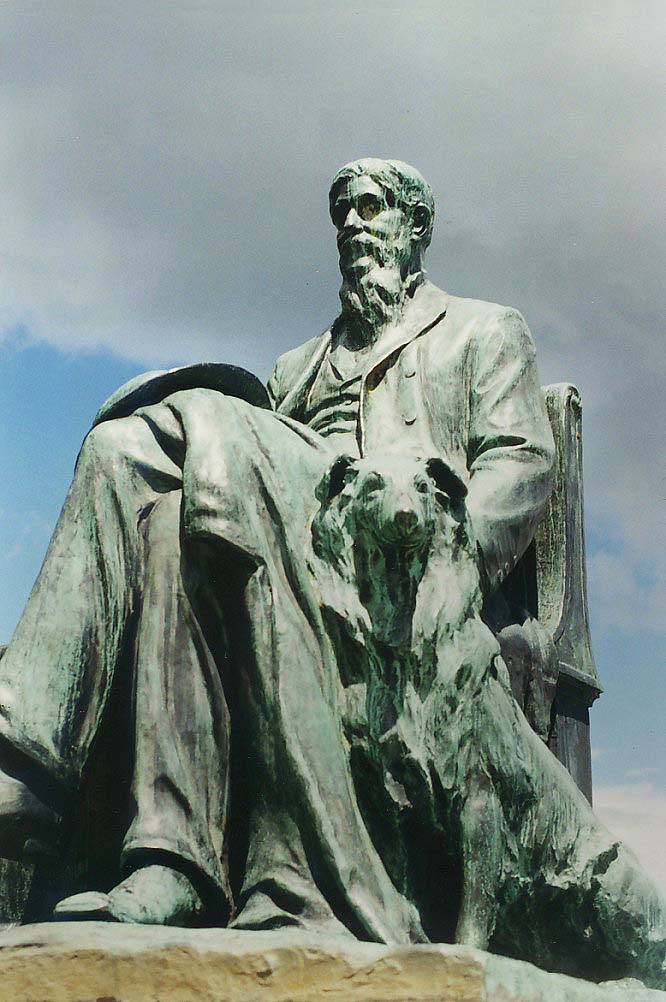
Jay Cooke Monument (1921), Jay Cooke Plaza, Duluth, Minnesota.

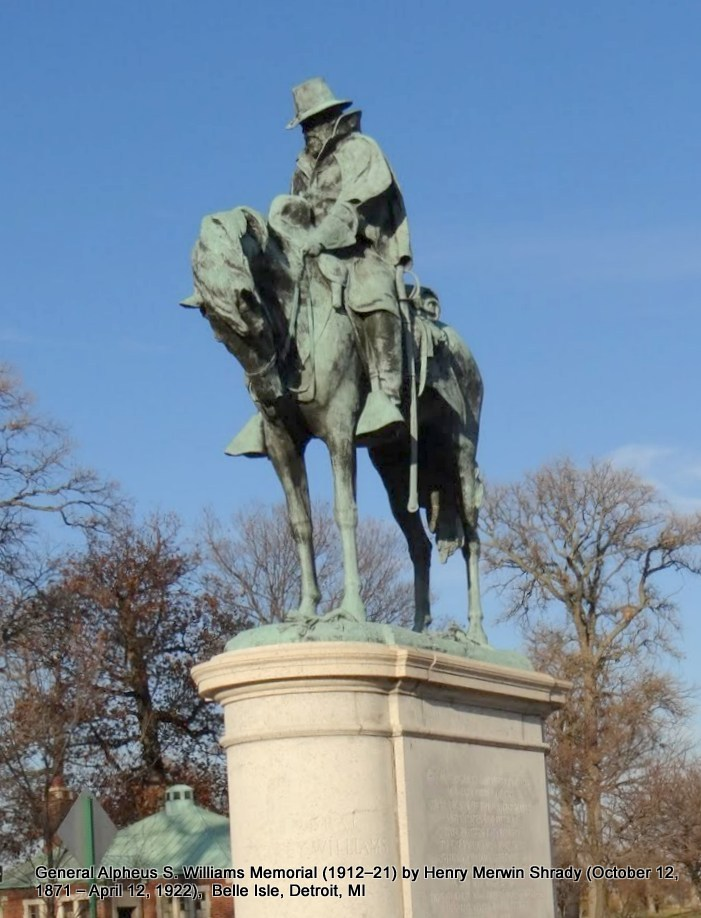
General Alpheus Starkey Williams Memorial (1810 – 1878) Henry Merwin Shady (1912–1921) Belle Isle Park, Detroit, Michigan
