= Ulysses S. Grant Memorial =

Presidential memorial in Washington, D.C.

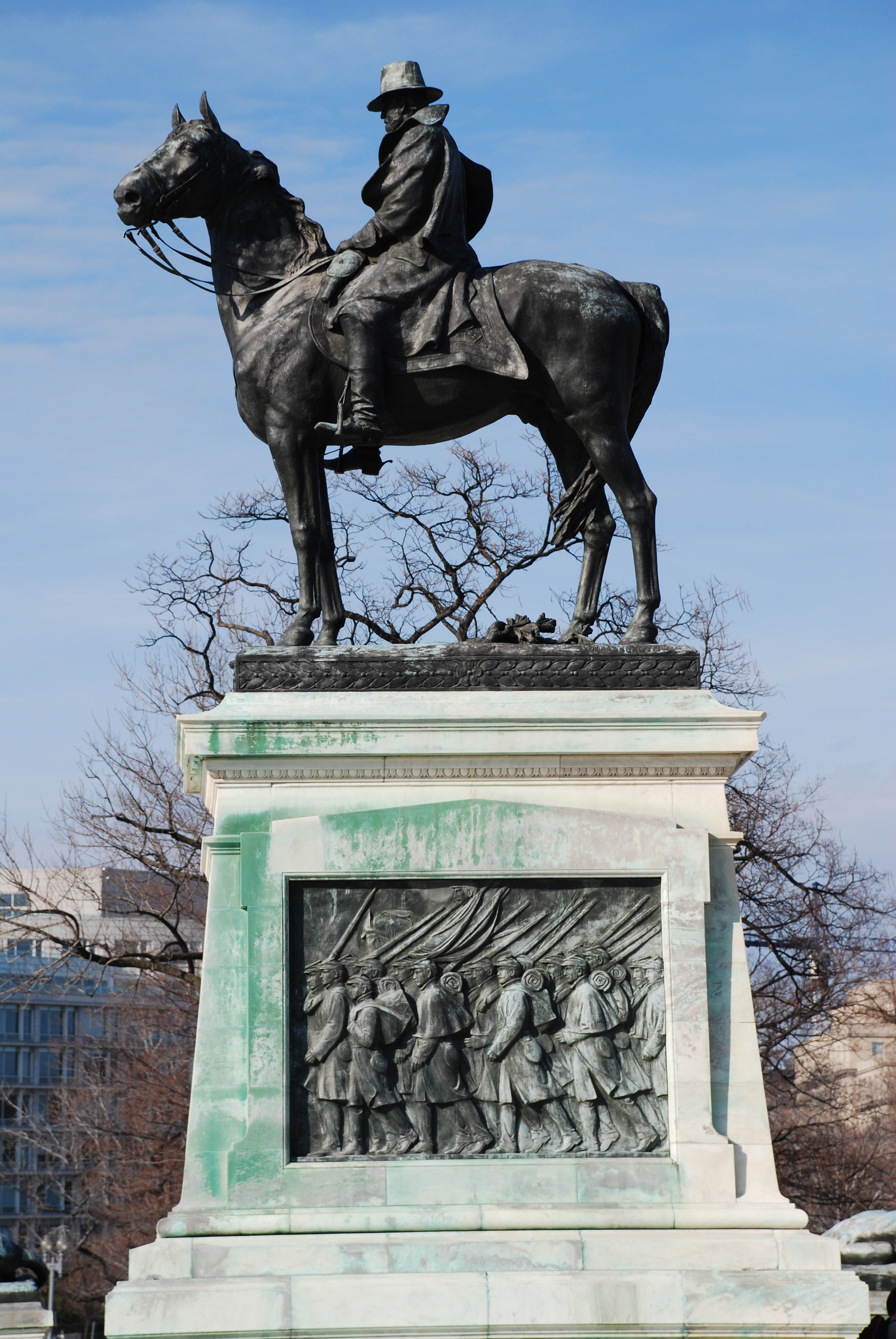
- Artist: Henry Shrady
- Year: begun 1902 completed 1924
- Type: Bronze
- Dimensions: 5.2 m × 5.0 m × 1.2 m (206 in × 196 in × 48 in)
- Location: West side of the U.S. Capitol Washington, D.C.
- Owner: Architect of the Capitol

- Ulysses S. Grant Memorial
- U.S. National Register of Historic Places
- U.S. Historic district – Contributing property
- Location within Washington, D.C.
- Location: Washington, D.C.
- Coordinates: 38°53′23.24″N 77°0′46.49″W
- Part of: Civil War Monuments in Washington, DC.
- NRHP reference No.: 78000257
- Added to NRHP: September 20, 1978

The Ulysses S. Grant Memorial is a presidential memorial in Washington, D.C., honoring American Civil War general and 18th president of the United States, Ulysses S. Grant. It sits at the base of Capitol Hill (Union Square, the Mall, 1st Street NW/SW, between Pennsylvania Avenue and Maryland Avenue), below the west front of the United States Capitol. Its central sculpture of Grant on horseback faces west, overlooking the Capitol Reflecting Pool and facing toward the Lincoln Memorial, which honors Grant's wartime president, Abraham Lincoln. Grant's statue is raised on a pedestal decorated with bronze reliefs of the infantry; flanking pedestals hold statues of protective lions and bronze representations of the Union cavalry and artillery. The whole is connected with marble covered platforms, balustrades, and stairs. The Grant and Lincoln memorials define the eastern and western ends, respectively, of the National Mall.

The Grant Memorial is a contributor to the Civil War Monuments in Washington, D.C., of the National Register of Historic Places. James M. Goode's authoritative The Grant Memorial in Washington, D.C. (1974) called it "one of the most important sculptures in Washington." It includes the largest equestrian statue in the United States and the fifth-largest in the world.

== Description ==
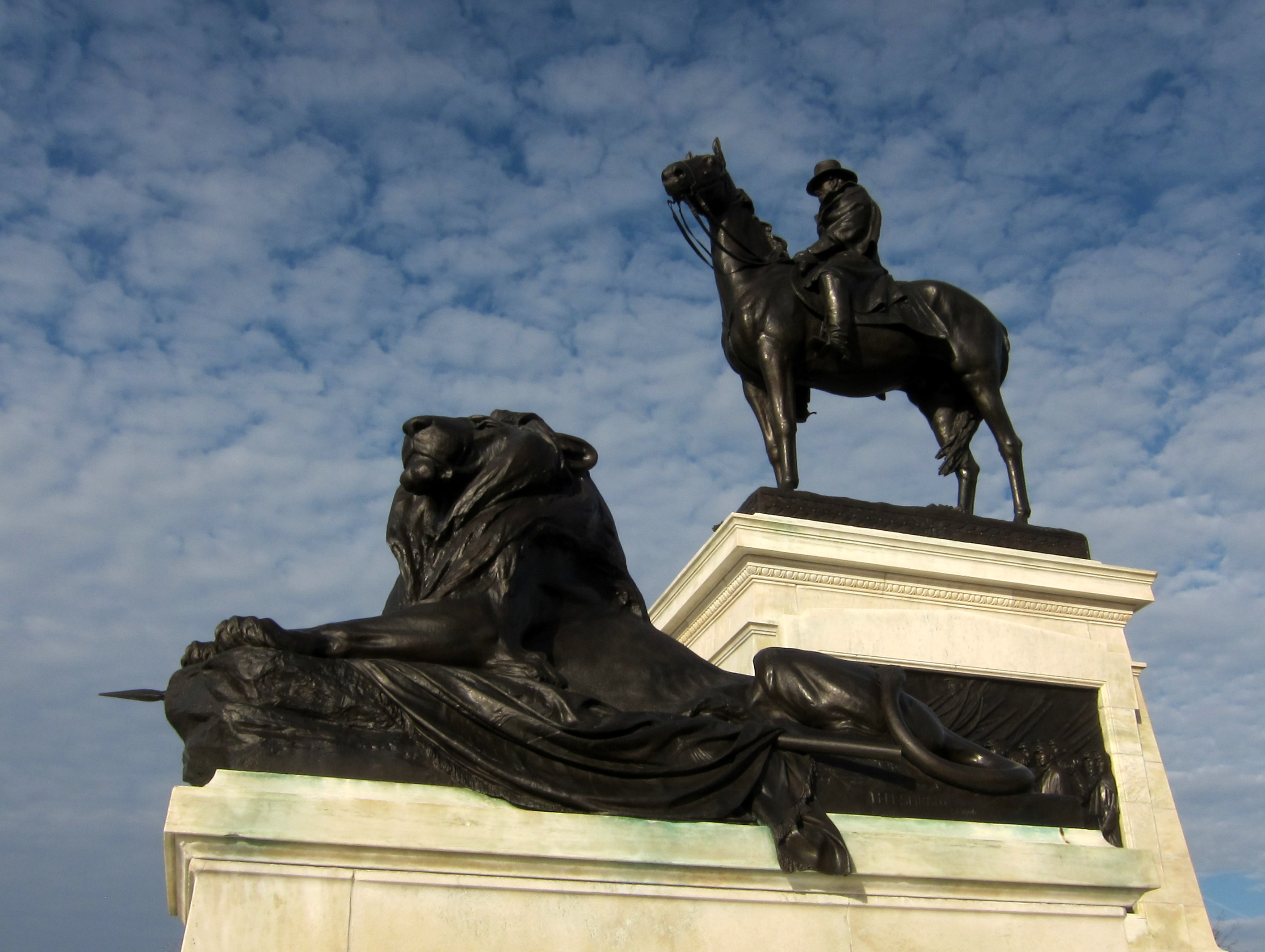
The central, equestrian statue of Grant with one of the four lions (2017)

The Grant Memorial is in Union Square, which also encompasses the Capitol Reflecting Pool. The platform for the Monument, made of Vermont marble, is 252 feet (77 m) long and 71 feet (22 m) wide and is divided into three sections. The tall, middle section features a 10,700-pound, 17-foot-2-inch (5.23 m) high equestrian statue depicting Grant astride his war horse Cincinnati on a 22½-foot high marble pedestal.

A striking feature of the central statue is Grant's calm (almost disaffected) attitude amidst the raging fighting going on around him. This is not surprising because Grant was known for his calmness and coolheadedness during battle. In sharp contrast to Grant are the sculpture groups on either side, Cavalry Charge and Artillery, which

... possess more dramatic interest and suspense than any sculpture in the city and, indeed, in the Nation.

Surrounding the main pedestal are four shorter pedestals, each supporting a bronze lion in repose guarding both the United States flag and the flags of the Army. The memorial was the largest bronze sculpture cast in the United States at that time.

The Artillery Group to the south shows a caisson carrying three artillerymen and pulled by three horses. Astride the horse on the left is the guidon (flag) carrier who is signaling a sharp right wheel. Despite the impending course change the horse on the right is able to continue lunging forward due to a broken strap on the right bridle bit. To the north the Cavalry Group depicts a color squad consisting of seven cavalrymen charging into battle. The horse on the right has fallen and the rider, modeled after Shrady himself, is moments from being trampled by the onrushing horses.

== History ==
The drive to erect a monument to Grant was begun in the 1890s by the Society of the Army of the Tennessee.

Work on the memorial was begun in 1902 as the largest ever commissioned by Congress at the time, was created by sculptor Henry Merwin Shrady and architect Edward Pearce Casey. Sculptor Edmond Amateis assisted Shrady as the monument neared completion in 1921. Shrady spent 20 years of his life working on the memorial and died, stressed and overworked, two weeks before its dedication in 1922.

The sculptures were cast in bronze at the Roman Bronze Works in New York. Construction on the site of the memorial began in 1909 when the marble superstructure and the four bronze lions were installed. The Artillery Group was installed in 1912, the Cavalry Group in 1916, and the bronze equestrian statue of Grant in 1920. The memorial was dedicated on the 100th anniversary of Grant's birth, April 27, 1922. Shrady having died, the infantry panels on the base of Grant's pedestal were completed by sculptor Sherry Fry based on Shrady's sketches and installed in 1924. The Grant Memorial composes the center of a three-part sculptural group including the James A. Garfield Monument to the south and the Peace Monument to the north.

During 2015 and 2016 a cleaning and restoration program was carried out on the memorial. This included the replacement of 150 elements of the work, such as swords and scabbards, that had gone missing or been stolen over the years. The layer of green corrosion on the memorial's bronze was removed to return it to its original brown color.

== Gallery ==
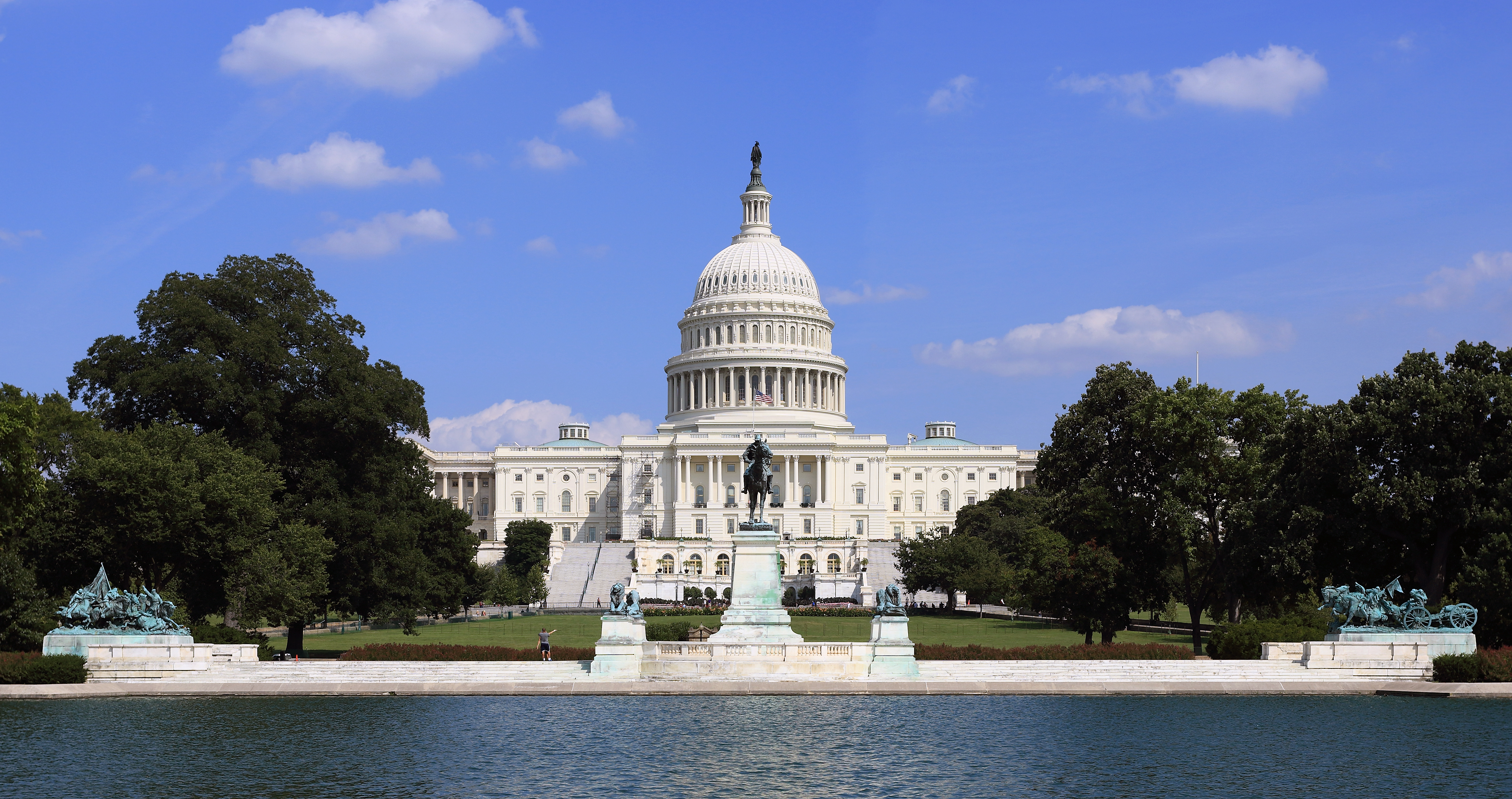
U.S. Capitol, Grant Memorial, and Capitol Reflecting Pool

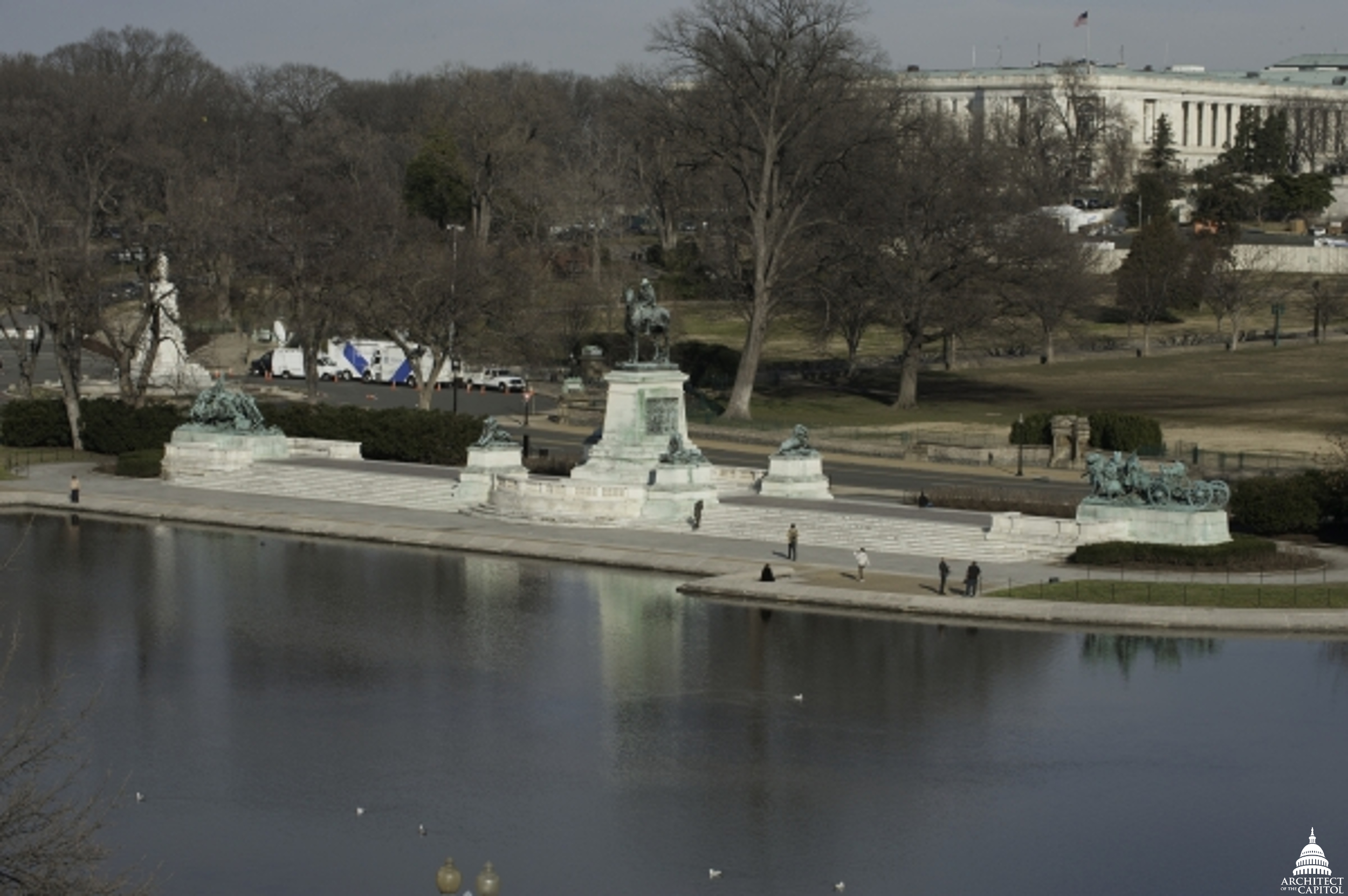
Aerial view

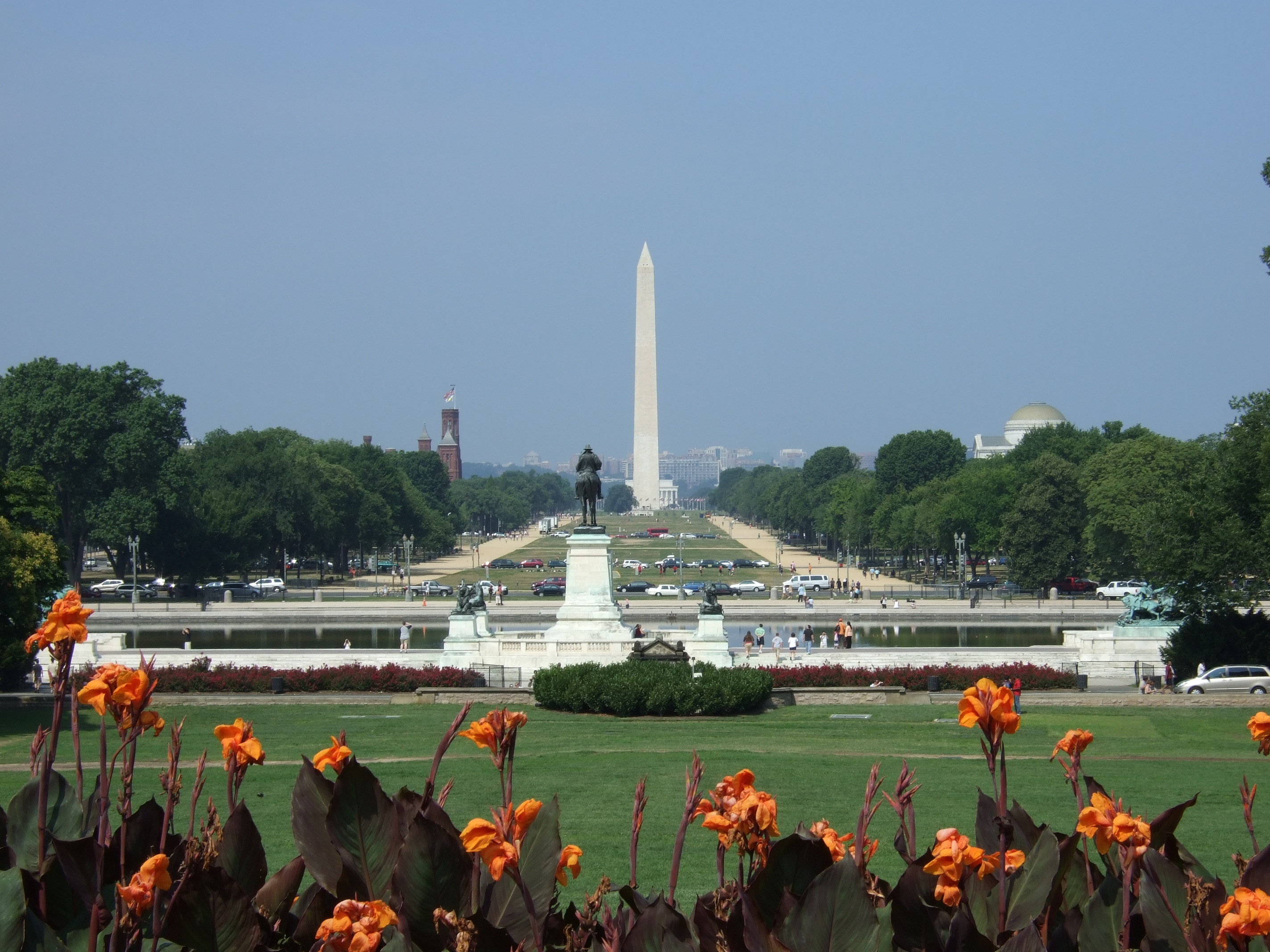
Grant Memorial from the east with the National Mall in the background

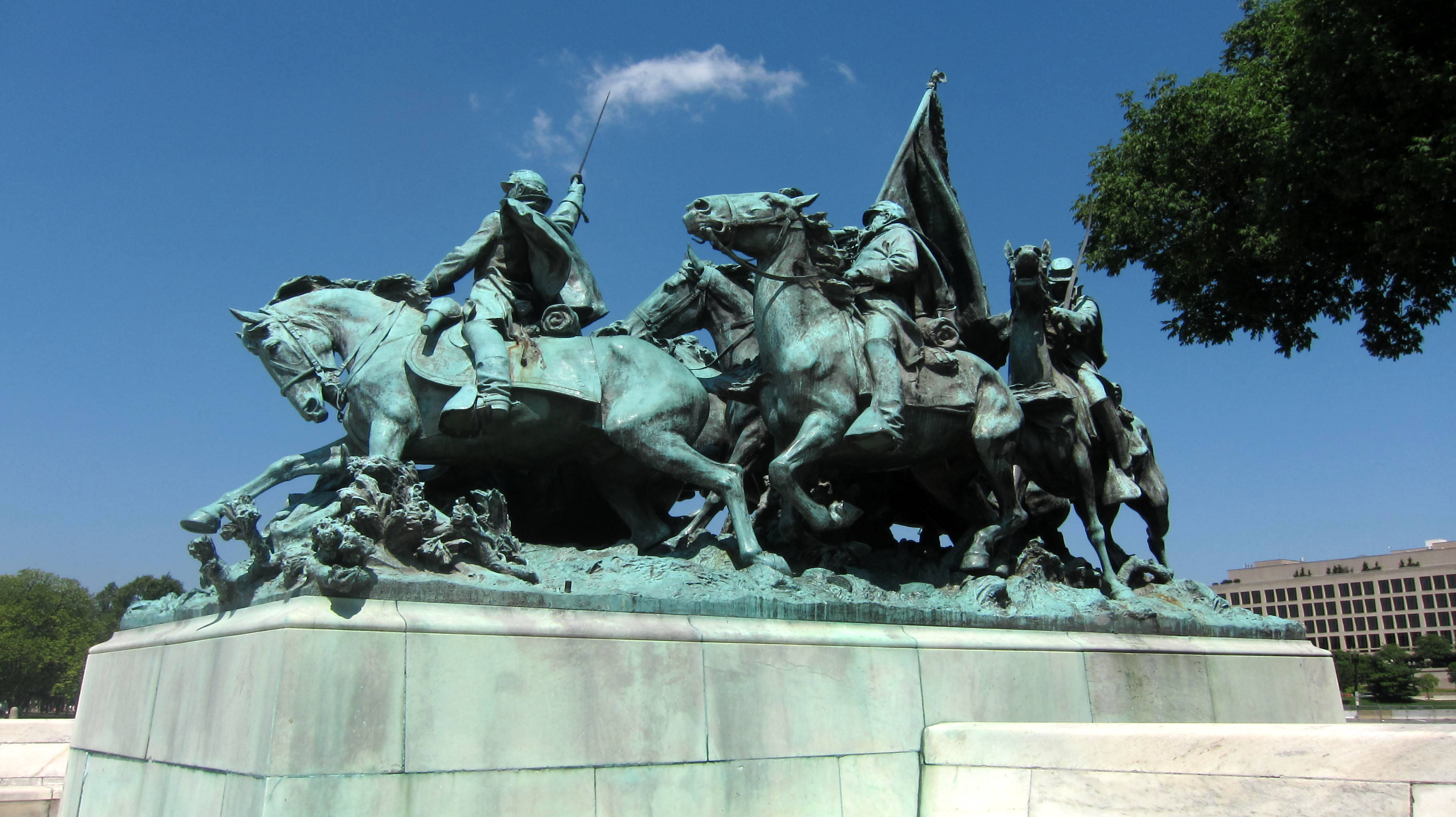
Cavalry Charge.

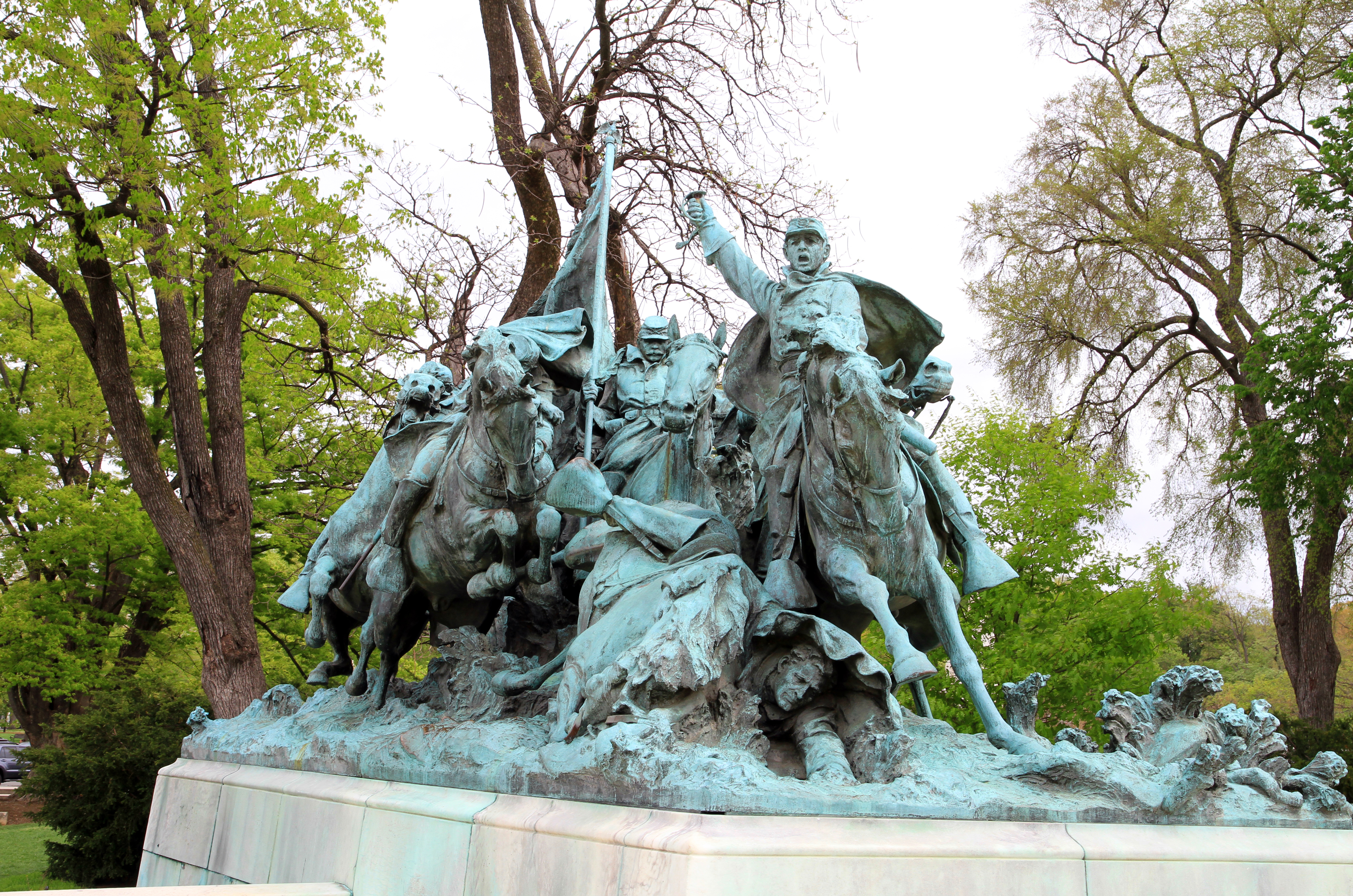
Cavalry Charge.

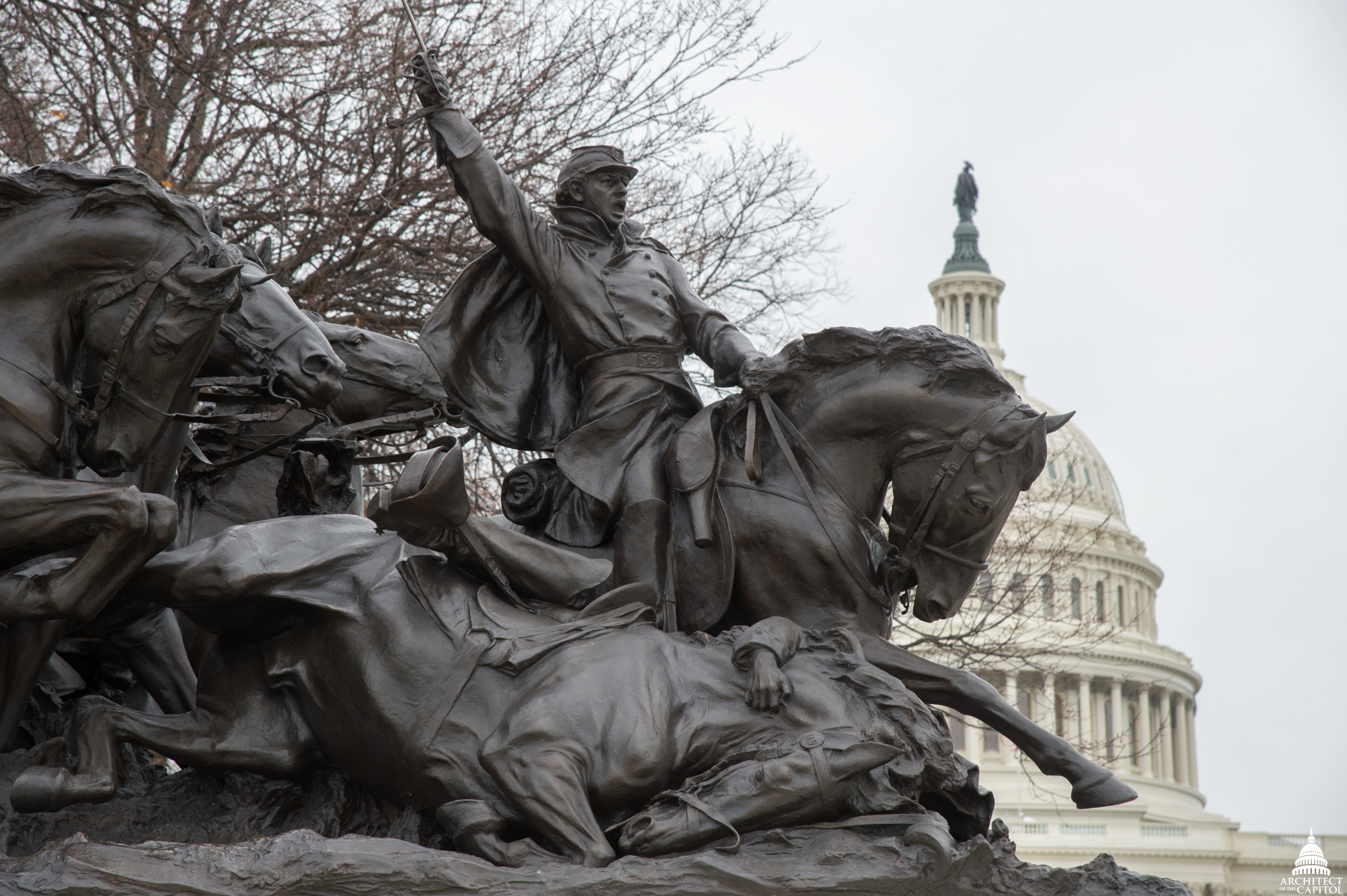
Cavalry Charge with restored bronze

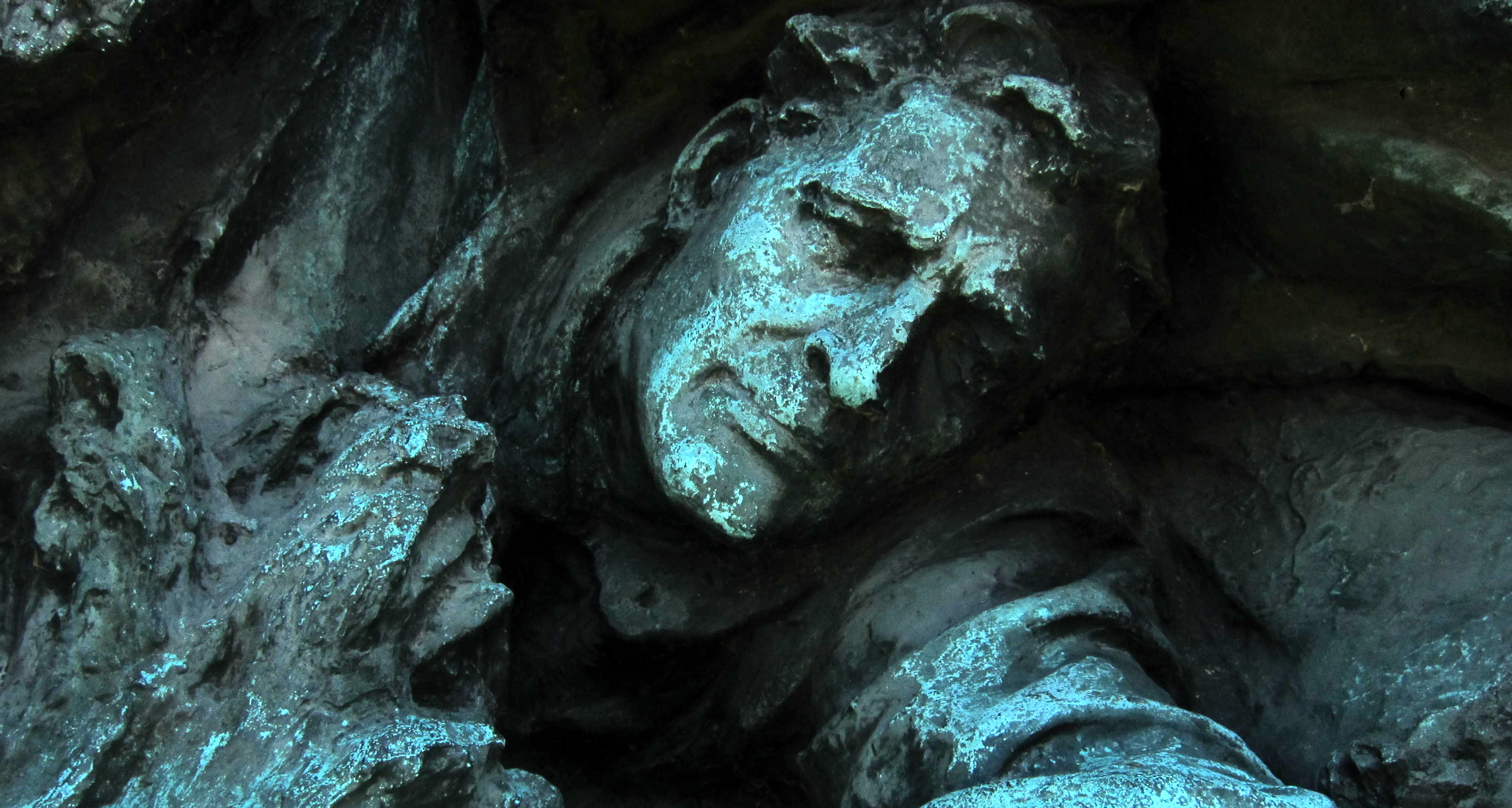
Detail of Cavalry Charge (possible self-portrait of Henry Shrady).

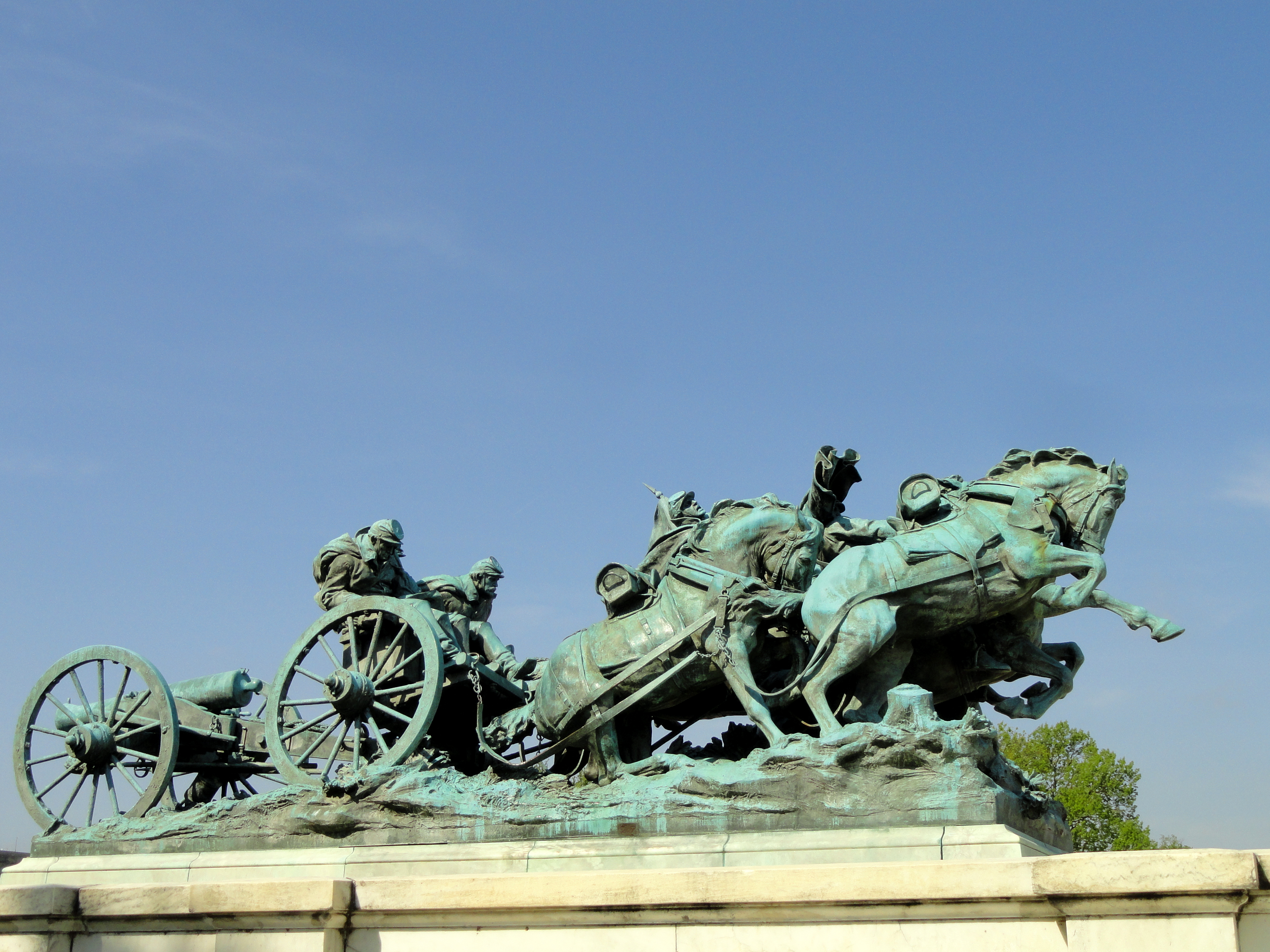
Artillery.

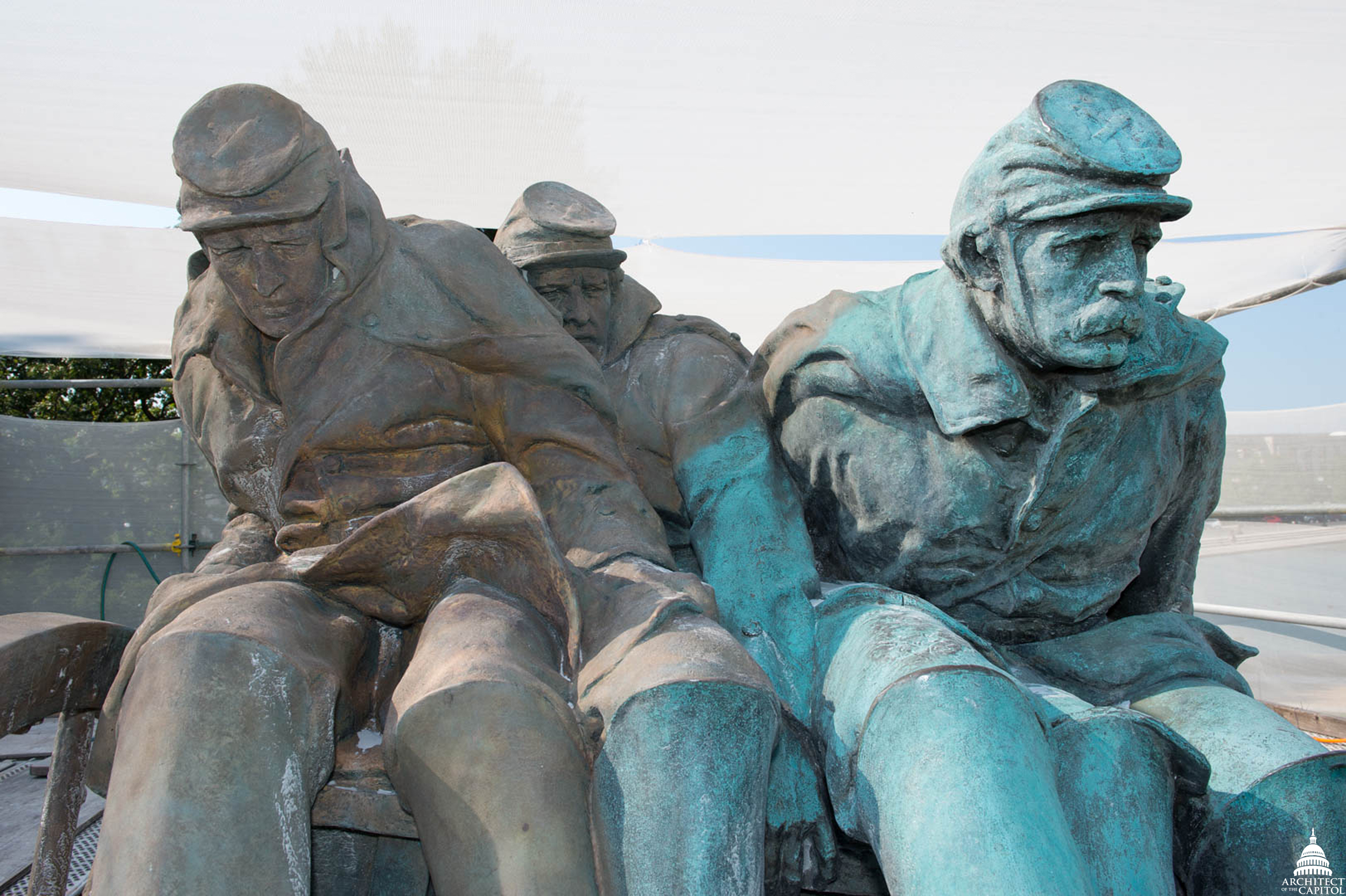
A section of the memorial during the 2015-2016 restoration

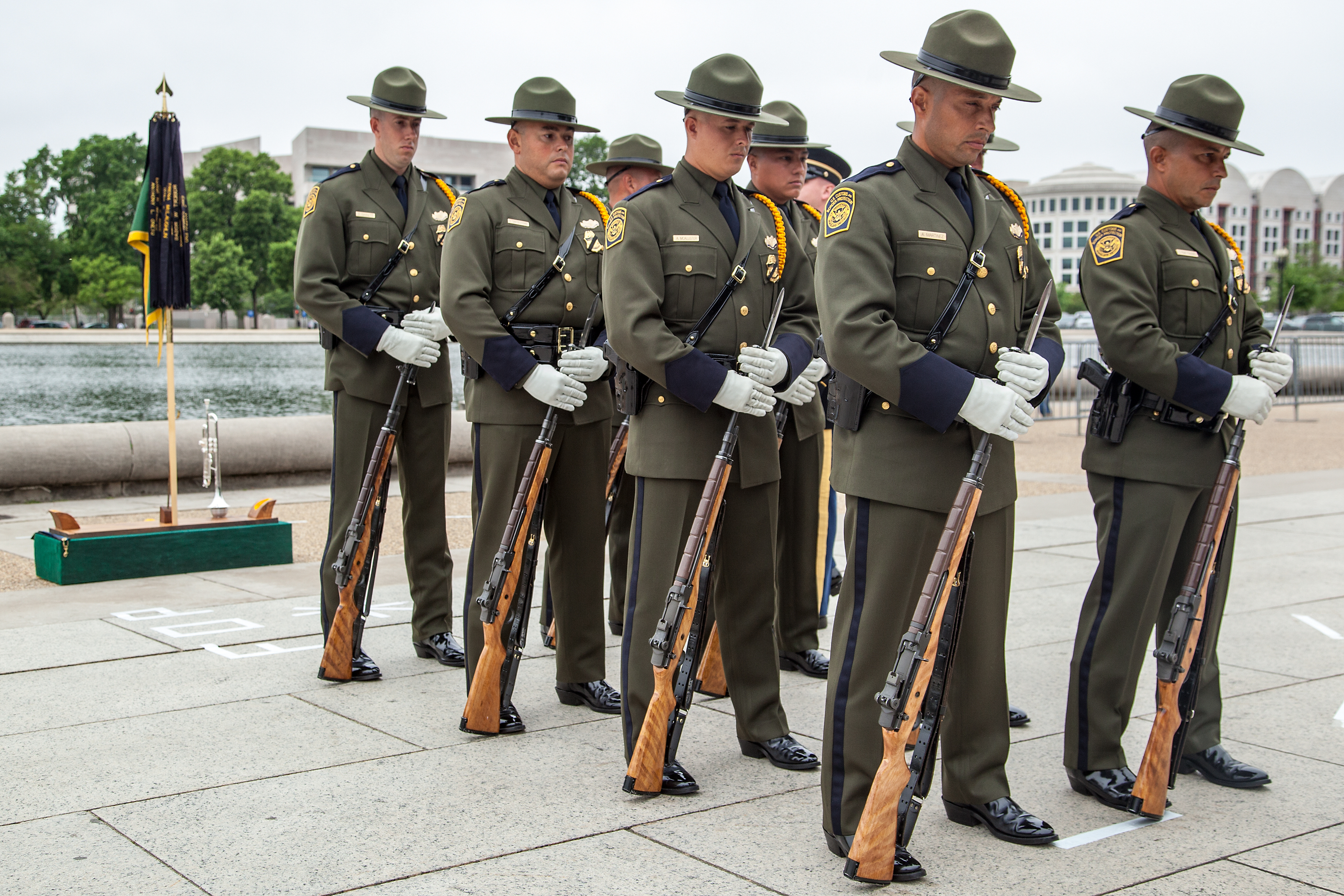
An honor guard of the U.S. Border Patrol at the Ulysses S. Grant Memorial on Peace Officers Memorial Day in May 2013.

== See also ==
- List of public art in Washington, D.C., Ward 2
- List of public art in Washington, D.C., Ward 6
- List of sculptures of presidents of the United States
- Horsemanship of Ulysses S. Grant
- Presidential memorials in the United States
- Statue of Ulysses S. Grant (U.S. Capitol)
