= McMillan Fountain =

Public artwork in Washington, D.C.

Coordinates: 38.9233°N 77.01274°W

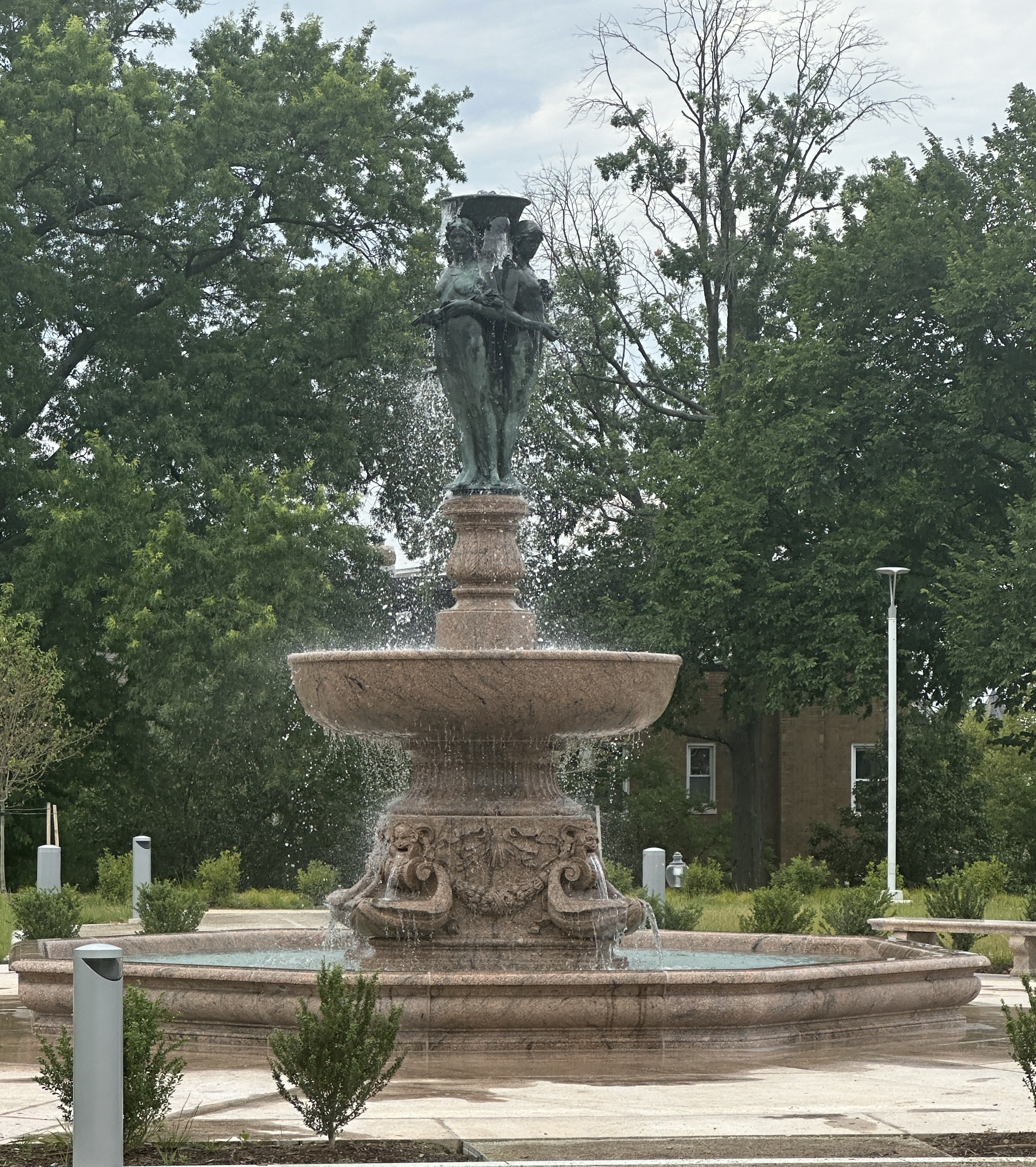
- Current state, fully reconstructed
- Artist: Herbert Adams
- Year: 1912
- Dimensions: 3.7 m (12 ft)
- Location: Washington, D.C.
- Owner: Reservoir District DC

The McMillan Fountain is a public artwork by American artist Herbert Adams located on the McMillan Reservoir grounds. The fountain, completed in 1912, emplaced in 1913 and dedicated after October 1919, consists of a sculptural group of the Three Graces placed upon a pink granite base. Cast by Roman Bronze Works, the fountain was originally part of a large landscape setting designed by Charles A. Platt. It was dismantled in 1941 and moved to storage. The partially reconstructed fountain currently resides near its original location at McMillan Reservoir in the Bloomingdale neighborhood of Washington, D.C.

== Acquisition and tribute ==
A tribute to James McMillan, the fountain was paid for by citizens of Michigan, who raised $25,000 by way of pennies, nickels and dimes donated by public school children. Congress also funded totaling $15,000 towards the completion.

In 1913 Charles Moore, a former aide to Senator McMillan and eventual chairman of the United States Commission of Fine Arts, described the fountain as "...a beautiful fountain is the one which seems most suitable to the memory of Senator McMillan, who was by nature quiet and modest in all personal matters. And its location, also, is most fortunate, for through his labors the water supply of Washington was perfected and a filtration plant was provided. The use of The Three Graces are meant to provide the viewer of the fountain with a feeling of honor, allegorical generosity, grave, serenity and virtue – metaphorical reflections of McMillan's contributions and "civil morality."

Unlike many other fountains in Washington, which were often left dry during the city's extremely hot summers, the McMillan Fountain provided a constant source of water throughout the year, providing a restful and cooling spot for residents of the Bloomingdale.

== Dismantling and storage ==
In 1941 the fountain was dismantled and moved for a reservoir expansion to prepare for World War II. First the fountain was stored temporarily on the edge of McMillan Park (First & Douglas Streets, N.W.). The bronzes were crated, and the stones, benches, steps and pavements were stacked and protected by a wooden fence. The Commission of Fine Arts proceeded to research new locations for the fountain, considering The National Mall and West Potomac Park. In late June 1941 the installation of the fountain, several hundred feet from the District of Columbia War Memorial. The National Park Service estimated a cost of $17,500 to move the fountain. However, with the attack on Pearl Harbor the plans were dismissed due to cost.

In 1945 the Arts Commission revisited the re-installation of the fountain. The fountain had since been moved to an open-air storage space at West Potomac Park. National Mall and Memorial Parks started to seek a proper location while the funding for the move was raised to $25,000. In November of that year it was agreed that the fountain would be moved to the soon-to-be moved National Rose Garden. In November 1947 the plans were approved for the site and location in the garden and senate approved the funding for the installation.

Another year passed and no action took place regarding the move or the garden. The Department of the Navy decided against tearing down the dorms that were needed for the garden building to take place, choosing to leave the buildings up another year. The fountain continued to remain "stored" on the National Mall grounds exposed to the environment and park visitors. The building process never proceeded and sometime between 1957 and 1974 the fountain's approximately 80 pieces were moved to an off-site park service storage facility in Fort Washington, Maryland.

== Re-dedication and return to Bloomingdale ==
In the late 1970s, community leaders in Bloomingdale organized to bring the McMillan Fountain back to their neighborhood. Rick Sowell, a D.C. Recreation Department leader, led teenagers working in the city's summer jobs programs to uncover the fountain's 77 pieces, then covered in mud and blackberry brambles in Fort Washington. The fountain parts were collected over several summers, but the pink marble was beyond repair and the Department of the Interior had lost the directions on how to piece the fountain together. Sowell received authorization to take the nymphs, basin, pedestal and two benches for exhibit in Bloomingdale's Crispus Attucks Park, which he had turned into a makeshift museum.

In July 1983 the Hyman Construction Company moved five major pieces of the fountain to the museum in Crispus Attucks Park, mere blocks from where it originally stood. The fountain was dedicated by Mayor Marion S. Barry on July 29, 1983. At the unveiling, Bloomingdale local Robert Brannum described the return of the fountain as "having a cherished family heirloom back on the mantle." Richard Sowell, Jr., then executive director of the Crispus Attucks Museum (now Park) believed that "McMillan emphasized that as citizens in the nation's capital all Washingtonians should be curators of this living museum."

Due to funding problems and a major fire at the museum, park expansion and the fountain's full restoration were cut short by 1991. In 1992 pieces from the fountain that needed conservation work were cleaned and polished by National Park Service conservators and the fountain was placed back at McMillan Reservoir, about 50 yards from where it originally stood.

The McMillan Fountain was relocated to and fully reconstructed at McMillan Park with its official opening on June 15, 2024. Some media referred to it as "The Three Graces Fountain".
