= James McMillan (politician) =

American politician (1838–1902)

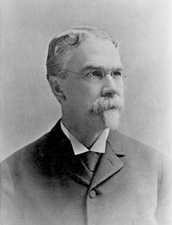

United States Senator from Michigan
- In office March 4, 1889 – August 10, 1902
- Preceded by: Thomas W. Palmer
- Succeeded by: Russell A. Alger

Personal details
- Born: May 12, 1838 Hamilton, Upper Canada
- Died: August 10, 1902 (aged 64) Manchester, Massachusetts (present-day Manchester-by-the-Sea, Massachusetts), U.S.
- Party: Republican
- Spouse: Mary Lucy Wetmore
- Children: William Charles McMillan; Grace Fisher McMillan; James Howard McMillan; Amy McMillan; Philip Hamilton McMillan; Francis Wetmore McMillan

James McMillan (May 12, 1838 – August 10, 1902) was an American politician and businessman who was a Republican U.S. senator from Michigan, as well as the chair of the McMillan Commission.

== Biography ==
McMillan was born in Hamilton, Upper Canada, to William and Grace McMillan, both Scottish natives. He attended Hamilton public schools before moving to Detroit, Michigan, in 1855 to embark on a career in business. McMillan's first position was as a clerk for Buhl, Ducharme & Co., a wholesale hardware firm. At the age of 20, he left to become the purchasing agent for the Detroit & Milwaukee Railway. In 1863, he helped, along with John Stoughton Newberry, to organize the Michigan Car Company for the manufacture of freight cars. This business grew very rapidly, and in ten years it was one of the largest in the United States. Its success led to the formation of the Detroit Car Wheel Co., the Baugh Steam Forge Co., the Detroit Iron Furnace Co., and the Vulcan Furnace Co. He was also a major shareholder in the Detroit City Railway.

McMillan later built and became president of the Duluth, South Shore and Atlantic Railway. He was largely interested in shipbuilding and lake transportation companies. He was one of the largest owners of the Detroit and Cleveland Steam Navigation Co., and the Detroit Transportation Co., and was a director of several banks in Detroit. For three years he was president of the Detroit Board of Park Commissioners and for four years a member of the Detroit Board of Estimates. In 1886, he joined with John S. Newberry in contributing $100,000 each for the maintenance of a hospital in Detroit.

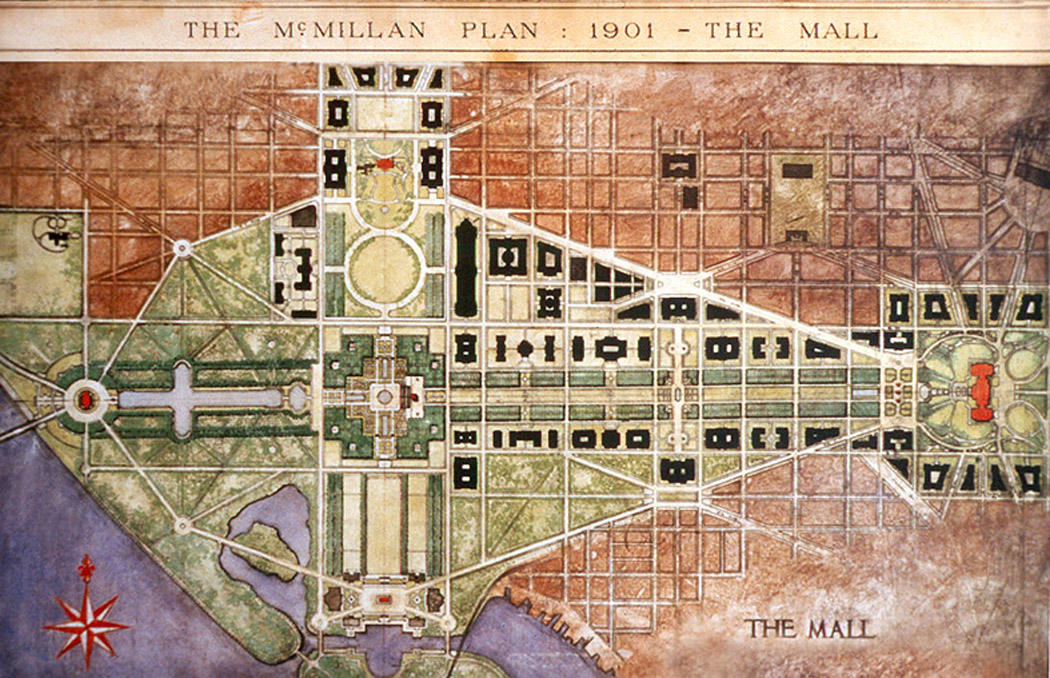
The National Mall was the centerpiece of the 1901 McMillan Plan. A central open vista traversed the length of the Mall.

McMillan was the only person to be elected Chairman of the Michigan Republican Party three non-consecutive times (1879, 1886 and 1890). He was a presidential elector on the Republican ticket in 1884. He was elected as a Republican to the United States Senate in 1889 and was reelected in 1895 and 1901, serving from March 4, 1889, until his death. He was a dominant figure in the party, leading the business interests especially in opposition to Progressive reformer Governor Hazen S. Pingree in 1897–1900.

He was chairman of the Committee on Manufactures in the 51st and 52nd congresses, and of the Committee on the District of Columbia in the 54th through 57th congresses. He is also remembered for his chairmanship of the Senate Park Improvement Commission of the District of Columbia (better known as the McMillan Commission), which recommended the redesign of the National Mall to better reflect Pierre (Peter) Charles L'Enfant's plan for Washington, D.C. The McMillan Reservoir and the McMillan Sand Filtration Site in DC also bear his name.

== Death ==
McMillan died in Manchester, Massachusetts, and is interred in Elmwood Cemetery in Detroit. He was survived by his wife Mary and their six children: William Charles, Grace Fisher, James Howard, Amy (wife of Sir John Lane Harrington, British ambassador to Ethiopia), Philip Hamilton and Francis Wetmore. Through his son James Howard McMillan, James is the great-great-grandfather of Baroness Sybille de Selys Longchamps, the mother of Princess Delphine of Belgium (Delphine Michèle Anne Marie Ghislaine de Saxe-Cobourg; born February 22, 1968), known previously as Jonkvrouw Delphine Boël, is a Belgian artist and member of the Belgian royal family. She is the daughter of King Albert II of Belgium with Baroness Sybille de Selys Longchamps, and the half-sister of King Philippe of Belgium. Before October 1, 2020, she belonged to the Belgian titled nobility and was legally Jonkvrouw Boël. On that date, she was lawfully recognised as Princess of Belgium with the style "Her Royal Highness".

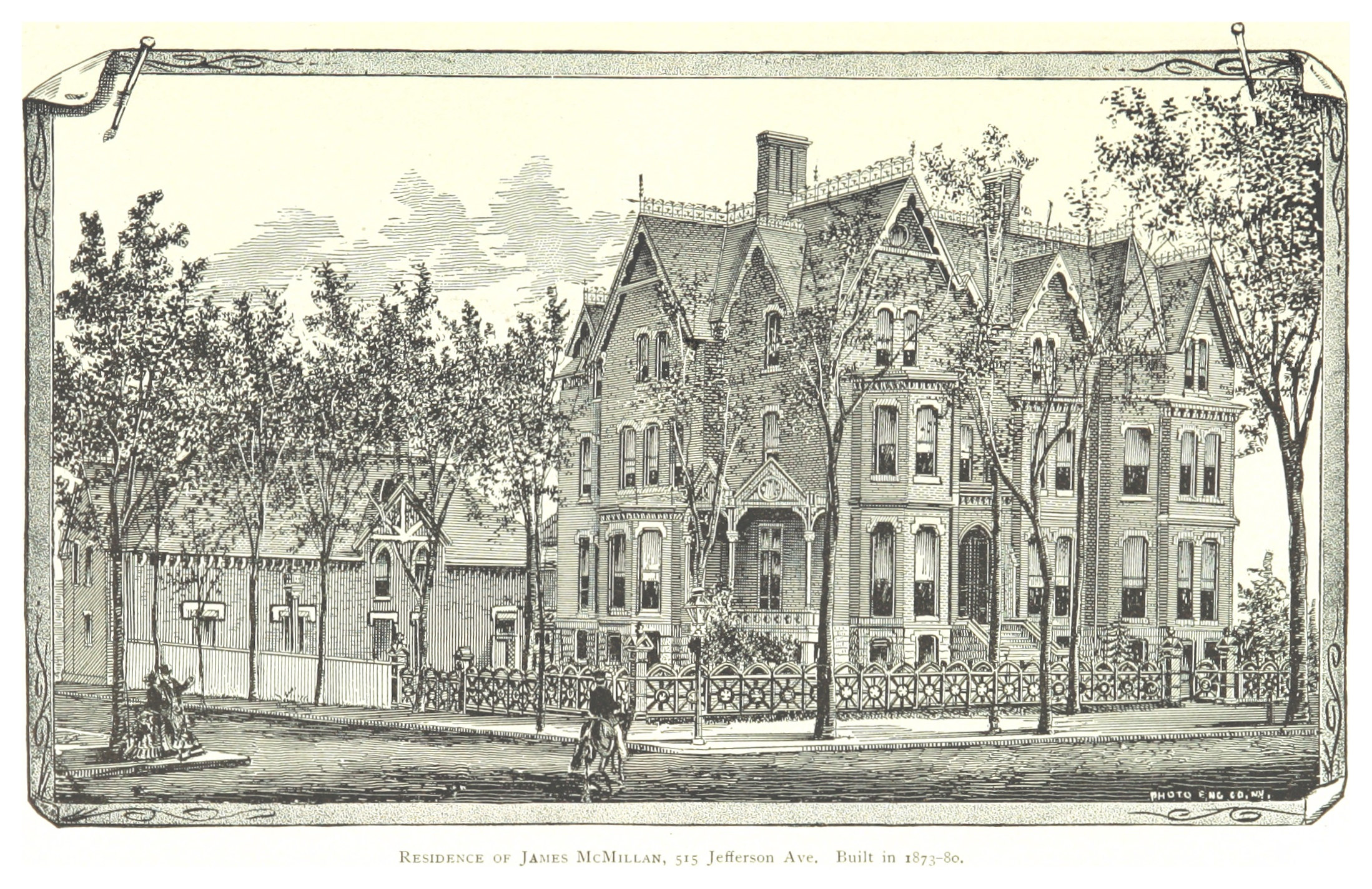
James McMillan Residence in 1411 East Jefferson Avenue, designed by Gordon W Lloyd and demolished in 1930.

== See also ==
- McMillan Fountain
- McMillan Plan
- List of members of the United States Congress who died in office (1900–1949)
- List of United States senators born outside the United States

== Bibliography ==
- American National Biography
- Dictionary of American Biography
- Drutchas, Geoffrey G. (Fall 2002). "Gray Eminence in a Gilded Age: The Forgotten Career of Senator James McMillan of Michigan". Michigan Historical Review. 28: 78–113. Archived from the original on March 8, 2016 – via Questia.
- Drutchas, Geoffrey G. "The Man With a Capital Design." Michigan History 86 (March/April 2002): 36–38.
- Heyda, Marie. "Senator James McMillan and the Flowering of the Spoils System." Michigan History 54 (Fall 1970): 183-200
- Michigan. Legislature. In Memory of Hon. James McMillan, Senator in the Congress of the United States from Michigan. Lansing: R. Smith Printing Co., 1903.
- Moore, Charles. "James M’Millan, United States Senator from Michigan." Michigan Historical Collections 39 (1915): 173–87.
- U.S. Congress. James McMillan: (Late a Senator from Michigan). Memorial Addresses Delivered in the Senate and House of Representatives. 57th Cong., 2d sess., 1902–1903. Washington: Government Printing Office.

== Notes ==
Party political offices
| Preceded by Zachariah Chandler | Chairman of the Michigan Republican Party; 1879–1880 | Succeeded by Henry P. Baldwin |
| Preceded by Philip T. Van Zile | Chairman of the Michigan Republican Party; 1886–1888 | Succeeded by George H. Hopkins |
| Preceded by George H. Hopkins | Chairman of the Michigan Republican Party; 1890–1896 | Succeeded by Dexter M. Ferry |
U.S. Senate
| Preceded by Thomas W. Palmer | U.S. senator (Class 2) from Michigan; 1889–1902; Served alongside: Francis B. Stockbridge, John Patton Jr., Julius C. Burrows | Succeeded by Russell A. Alger |
