= McMillan Reservoir =

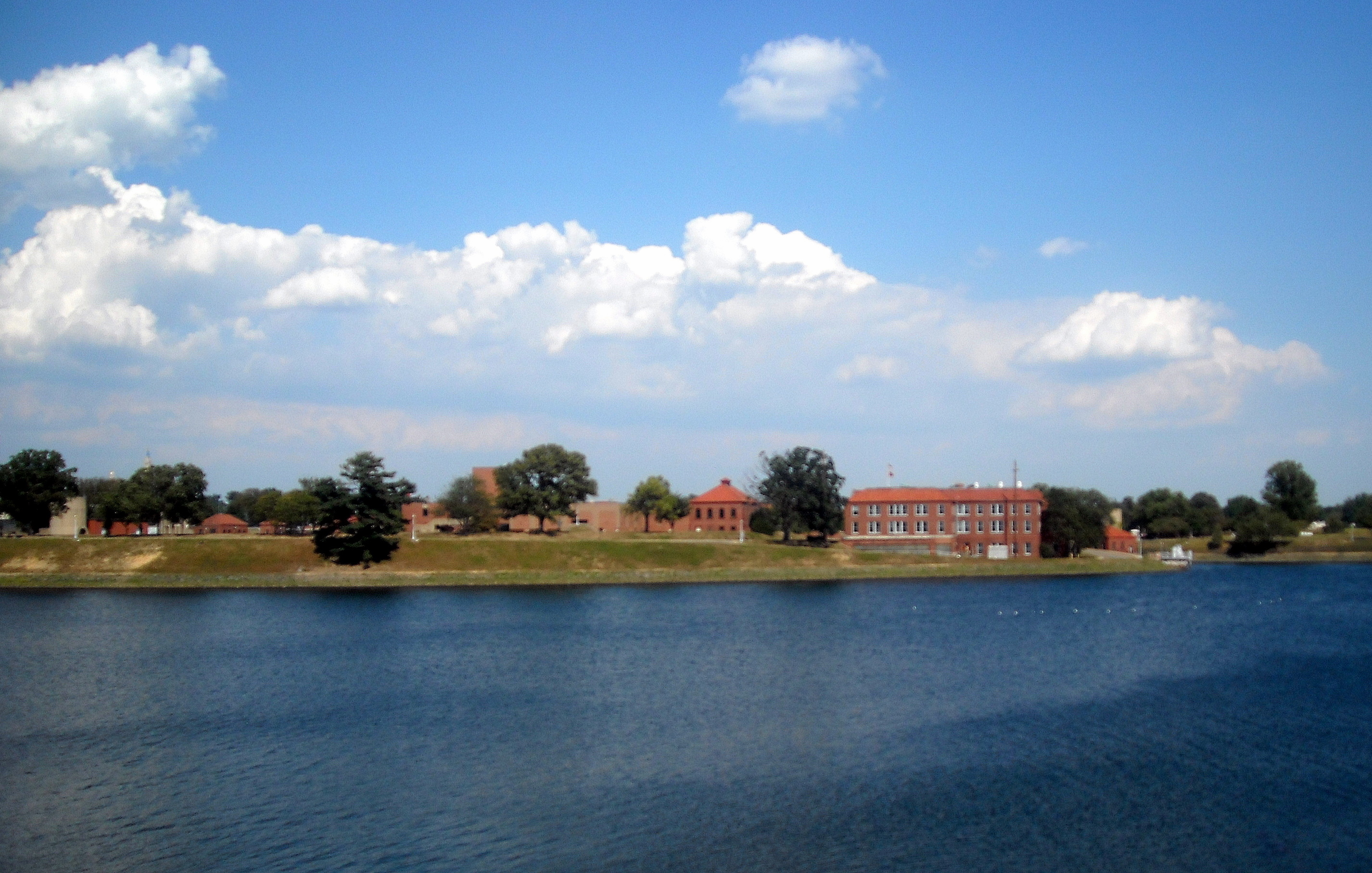

- Location within the District of Columbia
- Location: Washington, D.C.
- Coordinates: 38.9251°N 77.0173°W
- Type: reservoir
- Primary inflows: Washington Aqueduct
- Basin countries: United States
- Surface area: 25 acres (10 ha)

The McMillan Reservoir is a reservoir in Washington, D.C., that supplies most of the city's municipal water. It was originally called the Howard University Reservoir or the Washington City Reservoir, and was completed in 1902 by the U.S. Army Corps of Engineers.

== Construction history ==
The McMillan Reservoir was built in 1902 on the site of Smith Spring, one of the springs previously used for drinking water. Washington's earliest residents relied on natural springs but this came to be inadequate as the city's population grew. In 1850, Congress determined that the Potomac River should be the city's principal source of water.

=== Washington Aqueduct ===
Work and study conducted under Lieutenant Montgomery C. Meigs led to the construction of the Washington Aqueduct, which began operations on January 3, 1859. Initially the system provided water to the city from the Little Falls Branch in Maryland, until the aqueduct construction was completed. Regular water service from the Potomac River source through the aqueduct began in 1864.

=== Washington City Tunnel ===
In the early years of operation, the water was routed through the system's two older reservoirs, Dalecarlia and Georgetown, which were designed to settle sediment out of the water. In 1882 the Army began building a new water supply tunnel, led by Major Garrett Lydecker of the Army Corps of Engineers. The purpose of the new Washington City Tunnel was to provide more storage, sedimentation and distribution capacity for the system. Lydecker estimated that the basic tunnel construction cost would be about $530,000, with some additional funds allocated for contingencies, such as lining portions of the tunnel, if needed. In October 1883 the Army issued a construction contract for $548,000. The contractor encountered considerable technical difficulties with varying soil and rock conditions, as well as surveying errors and tunnel alignment problems. By October 1885 the estimate for completing just the excavation of the tunnel was slightly under $1 million.

Construction of the tunnel was halted in 1888 due to a variety of problems including funding shortages, cost overruns, bribery and fraud associated with the construction process. A Congressional investigation was initiated to examine the Army's mismanagement of the project. During that period some improvements were made to the Dalecarlia portion of the system, and work on the tunnel finally resumed in 1898. The tunnel was completed in 1901 at a total cost of $2.6 million, and the McMillan Reservoir began operation in 1902.

=== Filtration plant ===
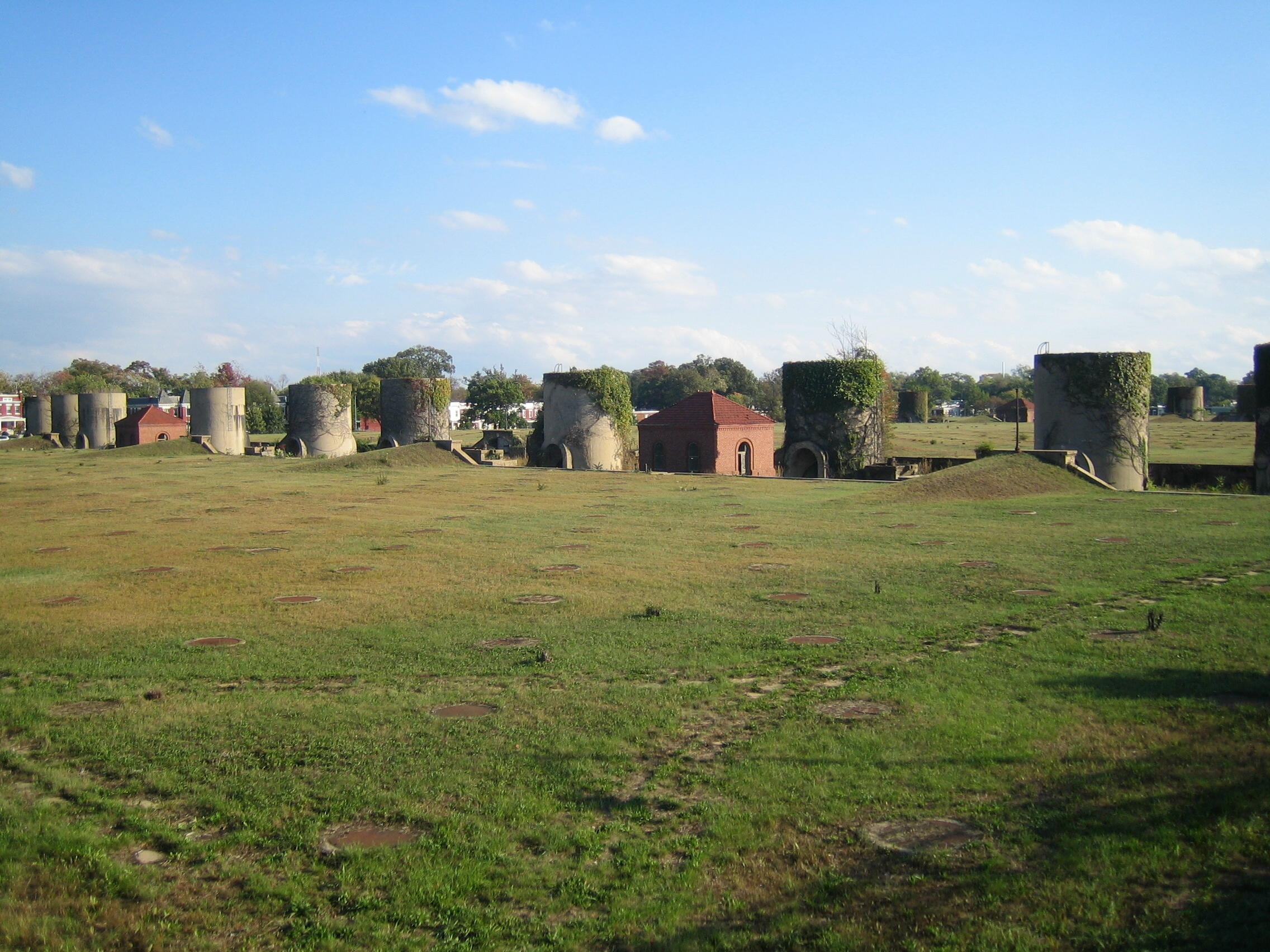
The Macmillan Sand Filtration system ceased operation in 1985

By 1902 it became apparent that the sedimentation process in the several reservoirs was not effective against pathogens such as bacteria, and was therefore not sufficiently protective of public health. To handle population growth and municipal sanitation needs, the city built the McMillan Sand Filtration Site in 1905. This facility implemented an innovative water purification system using slow sand filter technology to treat 75 million gallons (280 million liters) per day. It helped quell typhoid epidemics and other communicable diseases throughout the city.

In 1907 the reservoir and filtration plant were named in honor of Senator James McMillan of Michigan, who chaired the Senate Committee on the District of Columbia and supported development of the water supply facilities. Congress officially designated the site as a park in March 1911.

Subsequent improvements to the city water system were initiated beginning in the 1920s. The regular use of chlorine as a disinfectant began in 1923 at the McMillan filtration plant. Another treatment plant was completed in 1928 adjacent to the Dalecarlia Reservoir using a newer technology, a rapid sand filter.

In 1941, due to security concerns during World War II, the entire site was permanently closed and fenced off due to fear of sabotage.

After the war, the property remained closed to the public, but continued to supply the city with filtered water. The growth of the city population led to further expansions at the Dalecarlia site in the 1950s. The slow sand filtration system at McMillan was replaced with a rapid sand filtration system, built adjacent to the old system, in 1985. In 1986, the Army Corps of Engineers decommissioned the slow sand filtration site and declared it surplus. The old treatment site was purchased by the District of Columbia from the federal government in 1987 for $9.3 million, and the site began to deteriorate due to lack of maintenance. At that time DC government had no specific plan for the site.

In 1991, the McMillan Reservoir site was designated a DC Historic Landmark. In 2000, and again in 2005, it was placed on the "List of Most Endangered Properties."

The semi-solid residuals (sludge) produced by the treatment plant are processed at a residuals handling facility located at the Dalecarlia Reservoir. The residuals facility began operation in 2012.

== McMillan Fountain ==
The McMillan Fountain is a public artwork by American artist Herbert Adams located on the Reservoir grounds. The fountain, completed in 1912 and dedicated in October 1919, consists of a bronze The Three Graces placed upon a pink granite base. Cast by Roman Bronze Works, the fountain was originally part of a large landscape setting designed by Charles A. Platt. A tribute to James McMillan, the fountain was paid for by citizens of Michigan, who raised $25,000 by way of pennies, nickels and dimes donated by public school children. Congress added funding totaling $15,000 for its completion.

== Sand filtration site post-closure development ==
The D.C. government began considering the McMillan Sand Filtration Site for commercial and residential development again in 2007. The National Capital Revitalization Corporation (NCRC), a development agency created by the city, selected the site as part of a land swap deal involving Anacostia riverfront property and the construction of the Nationals Park baseball stadium. (The government dissolved the NCRC in 2007 and merged its functions into the Office of the Deputy Mayor for Planning and Economic Development.)

The government selected a development team, Vision McMillan Partners (VMP), in 2007. Their proposal includes a mix of uses, including housing, shopping and office space. The site would also include a network of accessible park space, including 6.25 acres (2.53 ha) on the southern end of the site, a 1-acre healing garden on the north end, and an acre of green space over a preserved cell at the north end.

In summer 2021 the City Council passed legislation authorizing demolition at the McMillan site. In October 2021 the D.C. Court of Appeals ruled that the proposed development project may proceed pursuant to the legislation. Demolition of the site commenced in October 2021.

In May 2023, the Washington Business Journal reported that the site had been renamed from the "McMillan Sand Filtration Site" to the "Reservoir District." As of January 2024, the site is being developed.

On June 15, 2024 D.C. Mayor Muriel Bowser cut the ribbon at the Reservoir Park Recreation Center at the former McMillan Sand Filtration site. With this ceremony the new 6.2-acre park and recreation center were declared open to the public.

== See also ==
- McMillan Plan
