= Alexander W. Buel =

American politician (1813–1868)

Alexander Woodruff Buel
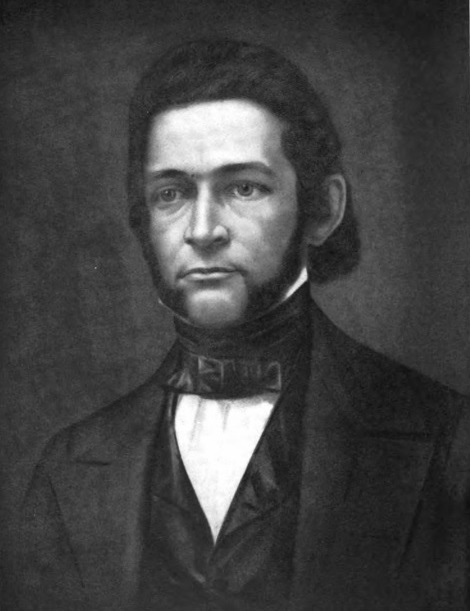
- From Volume 3 of 1915's History of Michigan

Member of the U.S. House of Representatives from Michigan's 1st district
- In office March 4, 1849 – March 3, 1851
- Preceded by: Robert McClelland
- Succeeded by: Ebenezer J. Penniman

Member of the Michigan House of Representatives
- In office 1859–1860
- In office 1848–1848
- In office 1838–1838

Personal details
- Born: December 13, 1813 Castleton, Vermont, U.S.
- Died: April 19, 1868 (aged 54) Detroit, Michigan, U.S.
- Resting place: Elmwood Cemetery; Detroit, Michigan
- Party: Democratic
- Spouse: Mary Ann Ackley Buel (m. 1836)
- Children: Julia Maria Buel Trowbridge; Mary B. Buel Wetmore; Clara B. Buel Mercur; Delia W. Buel Lydecker
- Education: University of Vermont; Middlebury College
- Profession: Lawyer
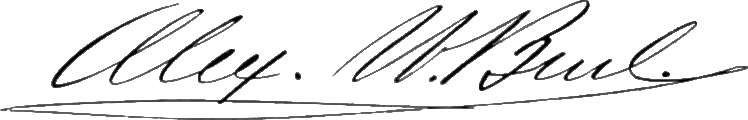
- Signature

Alexander Woodruff Buel (December 13, 1813 – April 19, 1868) was an American lawyer and politician from the U.S. state of Michigan. A Democrat, he was most notable for his service as a member of the United States House of Representatives from 1849 to 1851 and his multiple terms as a member of the Michigan House of Representatives.

== Early life ==
Buel was born in Castleton, Vermont, and exhibited precocious intellectual abilities. He attended the public schools in Poultney, Vermont, until the age of eight, at which time he began an accelerated course of studies preparing for college under the private tutelage of Henry Howe, the former principal of the Canandaiga Academy in Canandaigua, New York. In 1824, at the age of 10, he passed the admission exams for Middlebury College in Middlebury, Vermont, and was admitted to the college. However, concerned about the difference in age between Buel and the other college students, his teacher and family persuaded him to continue his independent studies for three years. In 1827, at the age of 13, Buel accompanied one of his teachers and was enrolled as a sophomore at the University of Vermont in Burlington, where he stayed for one year. In 1828, he decided to attend Middlebury College, which was his original intent. He was enrolled there as a junior and also taught at the common schools in Clarendon.

== Career ==
In August 1830, at the age of 16, Buel graduated from Middlebury College ranked first in his class. In September 1830, he became superintendent of a classical academy in West Rutland. In November 1831, he was invited to become principal of a classical academy at Fort Covington in northern New York, where he also began to study law. In December, 1832, he returned to his father's residence in Castleton and continued his study of law while also teaching at the Castleton Academy.

In October 1834, Buell moved to Detroit, Michigan, and within two months became Deputy Register of the Court of Probate. Because of his language skills, he was able to converse with the many French speakers native to Detroit at the time, as well as the increasing number of German immigrants. He was admitted to the bar in the spring of 1835 and commenced practice in Detroit.

Buel was city attorney in 1837 and a member of the Michigan State House of Representatives in 1838 and again in 1848, serving as speaker the latter year. He was the prosecuting attorney for Wayne County 1843–1846.

Buel first ran for the United States House of Representatives in Michigan's 1st congressional district in 1846, but lost in a close election. In 1848, Buel was elected as a Democrat from Michigan's 1st district to the United States Congress for the Thirty-first Congress, succeeding fellow Democrat Robert McClelland who did not run. Buel served from March 4, 1849, to March 3, 1851. He was an unsuccessful candidate for reelection in 1850 to the Thirty-second Congress and resumed the practice of law. He was again a member of the Michigan State House of Representatives in 1859 and 1860. He was appointed postmaster of Detroit on September 28, 1860, and served until March 18, 1861.

== Death ==
Buel died at his home in Detroit on April 19, 1868 (age 54 years, 128 days). He is interred at Elmwood Cemetery, Detroit.

== Family life ==
Buel was the son of Ezekial and Sally Thompson Buel. He married Mary Ann Ackley of West Rutland, Vermont, in October 1836, and they raised four daughters, one of whom was Julia Maria Buel Trowbridge. On April 8, 1862, she married Gen. Luther Stephen Trowbridge (Buel's law partner). The others were: Mary B., wife of Charles H. Wetmore; Clara B., wife of Col. James Mercur; and Delia W., wife of Gen. Garrett J. Lydecker.

U.S. House of Representatives
| Preceded by Robert McClelland | United States Representative for the 1st congressional district of Michigan; 1849–1851 | Succeeded by Ebenezer J. Penniman |
