= George H. Hopkins =

American politician

George Hiram Hopkins (November 7, 1842 – March 6, 1906) was a politician from the U. S. state of Michigan.

== Biography ==
Hopkins was born to Erastus and Climene (Clark) Hopkins in White Lake, Michigan and was educated at Pontiac Union School from 1860–1862. He then taught at a district school in Oakland County. In April 1862 he entered the State Normal School (now Eastern Michigan University).

In August 1862, Hopkins enlisted in the 17th Michigan Infantry, known as the Stonewall regiment and saw much action in the American Civil War. One of his brothers, Dan Hopkins who served in the same regiment was mortally wounded in the Battle of South Mountain on September 14, 1862. He saw action in Maryland, Virginia, Kentucky, Mississippi, at the Sieges of Vicksburg and Knoxville, and again in Virginia during the last year of the war which he served until its end. He returned to his studies at the State Normal School and graduated in 1867. He then entered the University of Michigan and graduated from the law department in 1871. In 1870, he was Assistant United States Deputy Marshall. He was admitted to the bar and practiced in Detroit.

During four year of the 1870s, Hopkins served as private secretary to Michigan Governors John J. Bagley and Charles Croswell. He served as chairman of the State Republican Committee briefly in 1878. In 1879 he served in the Michigan House of Representatives and was Chairman of the Committee on Military Affairs and also served on the Committee on Railroads. He served in the State House again from 1881 to 1883, serving as Chairman of the Committee on the University and a member of the Committee on Railroads and Apportionment in 1881, and Speaker pro tempore in 1883. He also served as Chairman of the Judiciary Committee and member of the Committees on State Library and the State Public Schools. During the political campaigns of 1882 and 1884, he served as Chairman of the Wayne County Republican Committee. He again served as Chairman of the Michigan Republican Committee from 1888–1890.

Hopkins died in Detroit on March 6, 1906.

== Notes ==
Party political offices
Preceded by Stephen D. Bingham	Chairman of the Michigan Republican Party; 1878	Succeeded by Zachariah Chandler
Preceded by James McMillan	Chairman of the Michigan Republican Party; 1888– 1890	Succeeded by James McMillan
