= Garrett Lydecker =

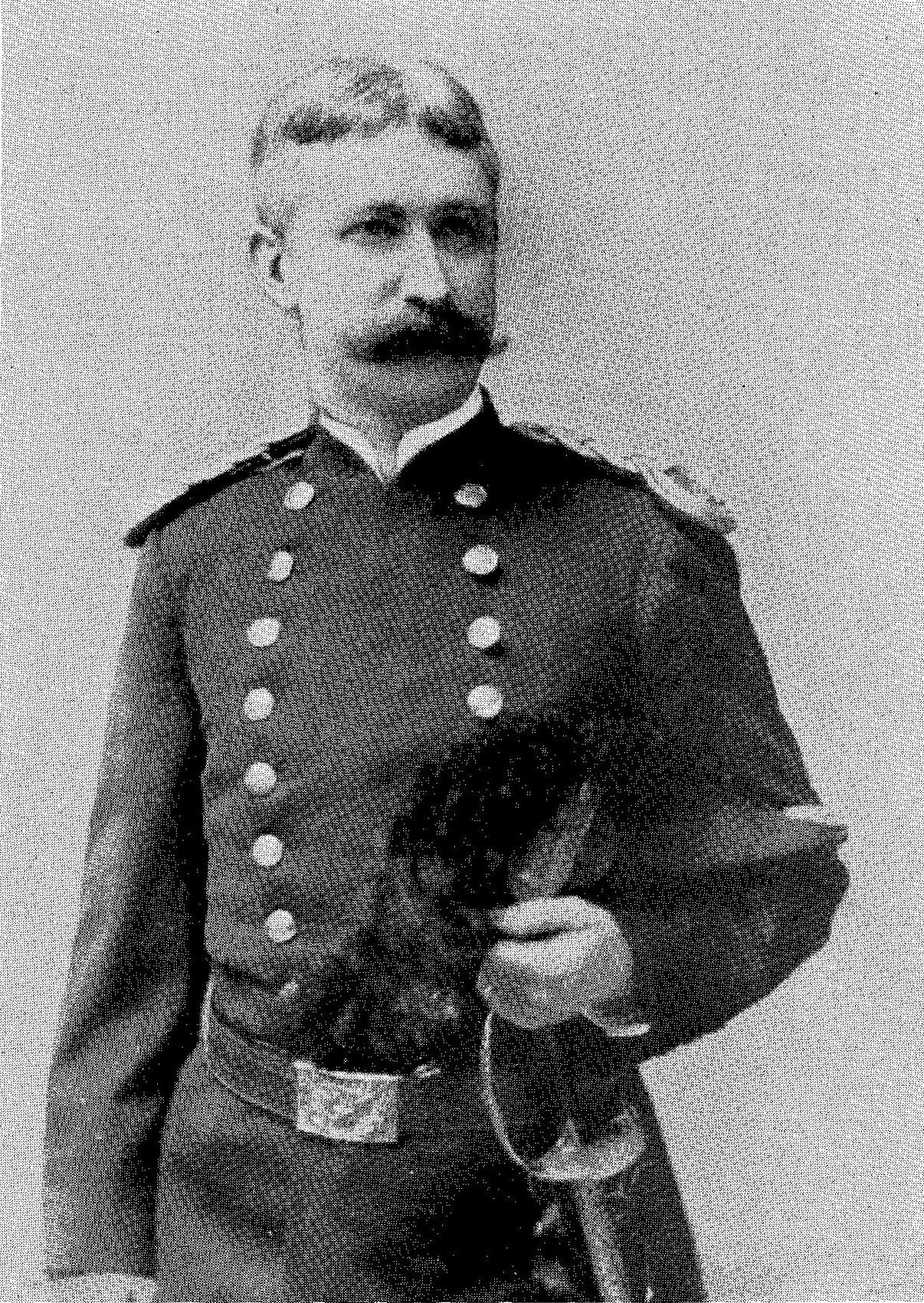
Garrett J. Lydecker

Garrett J. Lydecker (November 15, 1843 – July 9, 1914) was an American military engineer. He had a long career in the United States Army Corps of Engineers, marred by his mismanagement of the construction of the Washington City Tunnel, for which he was court-martialed.

== Early life ==
Lydecker was born on November 15, 1843, in Englewood, New Jersey. Lydecker was the son of John Ryer Lydecker (1824–1895), deputy collector of the Port of New York, and his wife Elizabeth (Ward) Lydecker (1827–1904). After attending the New York Free Academy, he was sponsored by Representative Daniel Sickles to attend West Point, graduating in 1864 as first in his class. He entered service as a first lieutenant but in April 1865 was brevetted to captain for his services at the siege of Petersburg, a rank made permanent in August 1866.

== Career ==
Lydecker spent over forty years in the Army Corps of Engineers, working on fortifications, harbor and navigation improvements, and supervising lighthouses. He spent three years (1869–1872) teaching engineering at West Point. From June 19, 1882, to April 1, 1886, he served as the Engineer Commissioner of the District of Columbia. He rose through the ranks to be appointed colonel May 10, 1901, and brigadier general upon his retirement on November 15, 1907.

In 1873, Lydecker was called upon to survey some of the area of the Modoc War and produced a report which helped document the events; he worked with photographer Eadweard Muybridge, who had been commissioned to photograph the terrain. Some of Muybridge's photos were used to illustrate Lydecker's report.

== "Lydecker Tunnel" ==
At the time Lydecker was appointed as the Engineer Commissioner in the District of Columbia, the water supply in Washington, D.C. was insufficient and a new reservoir had been proposed, later named the McMillan Reservoir. To feed the reservoir, Lydecker proposed a 4 mile long tunnel, deep underground - unlike the shallow and inexpensive "cut and cover" Washington Aqueduct which his predecessor Montgomery C. Meigs had built. Lydecker believed there was a solid layer of bedrock that would facilitate the project and estimated the project could be done for about $530,000.

By February 1886, the Washington City Tunnel project had been halted for lack of money; most of the tunnel had been excavated, but much of it was through loose rock and needed to be lined with multiple layers of brick surrounded by concrete. Over the next two years, Congress made multiple appropriations to support the work, but by 1888 $2.2 million had been spent and the project was not complete. Congressional investigations and inspections by outside experts revealed shoddy work approved by bribed inspectors and contracts for $15 per cubic yard of brickwork when similar contracts for work on the reservoir itself were for $9 per cubic yard. Lydecker himself was faulted for failing to supervise the work, rarely if ever visiting the worksites. Lydecker was court martialed and sentenced to forfeit $100 per month in salary for nine months and be formally reprimanded. He was reassigned to be Chief Engineer of the Department of the Columbia in Washington state.

Work on the tunnel was resumed in 1898 and completed in 1901, for a total project cost of over $2.6 million. It is still in use today.

== Later life ==
In 1869, Lydecker married Delia Witherell Buel (1845–1928), daughter of former Michigan congressman Alexander W. Buel; they had at least one child together, Alice Buel Lydecker (1873–1949).

Lydecker died on July 9, 1914, in Detroit, Michigan. He, his wife, and his daughter are buried in West Point Cemetery.
