= Ebenezer J. Penniman =

American politician

Ebenezer Penniman
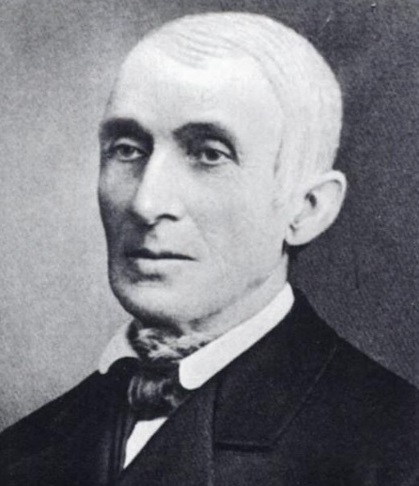

Member of the U.S. House of Representatives from Michigan's 1st district
- In office March 4, 1851 – March 3, 1853
- Preceded by: Alexander W. Buel
- Succeeded by: David Stuart

Personal details
- Born: Ebenezer Jenckes Penniman; January 11, 1804 Lansingburgh, New York, U.S.
- Died: April 12, 1890 (aged 86) Plymouth, Michigan, U.S.
- Resting place: Riverside Cemetery; Plymouth, Michigan
- Party: Whig
- Spouse(s): Maryette; Eliza Connor
- Children: 5
- Profession: Merchant, banker, politician

Ebenezer Jenckes Penniman (January 11, 1804 – April 12, 1890) was an American businessman and politician who served one term as a United States representative from Michigan from 1851 to 1853.

== Early life ==
Born in Lansingburgh, New York, the son of Chiron and Olive Whipple Penniman. Penniman attended the common schools and was apprenticed as a printer at the age of thirteen in the office of the New Hampshire Sentinel. When he was eighteen years of age, he bought his indenture and moved to New York City in 1822 to pursue a career in the mercantile business.

== Career ==
Penniman later moved to Orwell, Vermont, where he engaged in business as a dry-goods merchant. In 1840 he moved to Plymouth, Michigan and again engaged as a dry-goods merchant. He also served as supervisor of Plymouth Township in 1842, 1843, 1844, and 1850.

=== Congress ===
In 1850 Penniman defeated incumbent Democrat Alexander W. Buel to be elected as a Whig from Michigan's 1st congressional district to the Thirty-second Congress, serving from March 4, 1851 to March 3, 1853. He was the first Plymouth resident elected to the United States Congress. He was not a candidate for renomination in 1852.

He was a member of the convention that met under the oaks at Jackson, Michigan, July 6, 1854, at the organization of the Republican Party in Michigan. He was a delegate to 1856 Republican National Convention from Michigan.

=== Later ===
Penniman resumed mercantile pursuits until the First National Bank of Plymouth was organized in November 1871, and he, at the age of 67, was named president.

== Family ==
He married Maryette and they had two children: Mary and Julius A. Penniman. Maryette died in 1843.

He then married Eliza Connor with whom he had three children: Maryette, Ebenezer Julius, and Katrine E. Penniman

== Death and burial ==
Penniman died in Plymouth, Wayne County, Michigan, on April 12, 1890 (age 86 years, 91 days). He is interred at Riverside Cemetery, Plymouth, Michigan.

U.S. House of Representatives
Preceded by Alexander W. Buel	United States Representative for the 1st congressional district of Michigan; 1851 – 1853	Succeeded by David Stuart
