= McMillan Sand Filtration Site =

Decommissioned water treatment plant in Washington, D.C.

Coordinates: 38°55′28.1″N 77°0′37.7″W

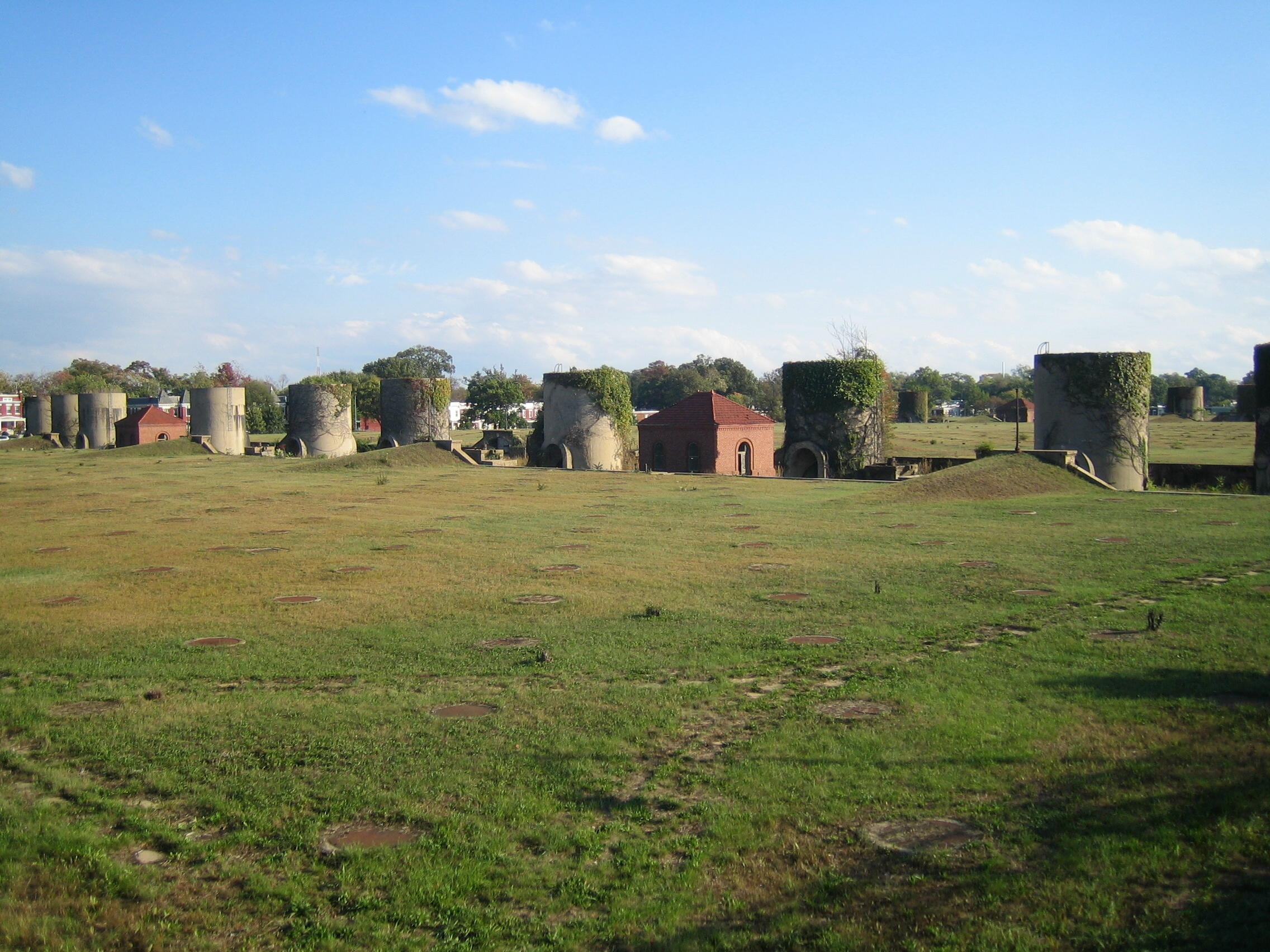
The McMillan Sand Filtration Site is no longer used for water treatment and is being redeveloped as Reservoir District.

McMillan Sand Filtration Site is a twenty-five acre decommissioned water treatment plant in northwest Washington, D.C., built as part of the historic McMillan Reservoir Park. It is bound on the north by Michigan Avenue, on the east by North Capitol Street, on the south by Channing Street and on the west by McMillan Drive; which runs along the edge of the reservoir, to which it was formerly attached. Two paved courts lined by regulator houses, tower-like sand bins, sand washers and the gated entrances to the underground filter cells provided a promenade for citizens taking the air in the park before it was fenced off in WWII.

Below grade, there are twenty catacomb-like cells, each an acre in extent, where sand was used to filter water from the Potomac River by way of the Washington Aqueduct. The purification system was a slow sand filter design that became obsolete by the late 20th century. In 1985, a new rapid sand filter plant replaced it across First Street beside the reservoir. The treatment system is operated by the Army Corps of Engineers.

Public access to the site has been restricted since World War II, when the Army erected a fence to guard against sabotage of the city's water supply. Until recently, specially arranged biannual tours were arranged for scores of visitors curious about the odd-looking structures. The site was never reopened to the public on the same basis as before the war.

In 1991, the D.C. Historic Preservation Review Board designated McMillan Park a Historic Landmark and nominated the site for the National Register of Historic Places. It included the site on their "List of Most Endangered Properties in 2000" and again in 2005.

== History ==
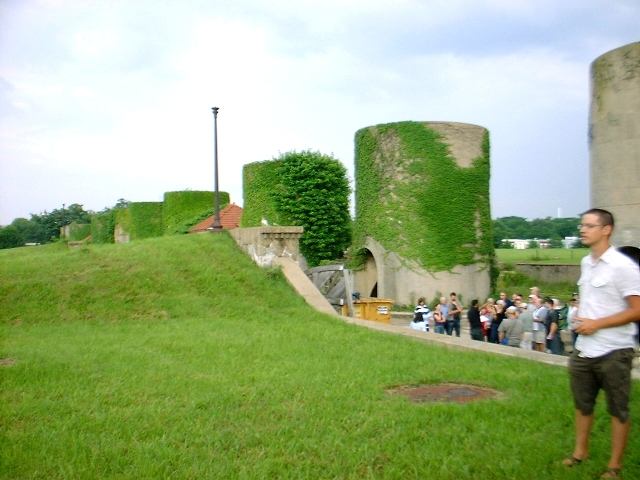
Tower-like sand bins covered in greenery as designed by Frederick Law Olmsted Jr.

The 1905 completion of the McMillan Reservoir Sand Filtration Plant was a Washington public health milestone. Its innovative system of water purification, which relied on sand rather than chemicals, led to the elimination of typhoid epidemics and the reduction of many other communicable diseases in the city. A legacy of the City Beautiful Movement and an integral part of the McMillan Plan to modernize Washington, the complex is an engineering wonder that served its original purpose until 1986.

Residents from the ethnically diverse neighborhoods near the park expressed their "delight in this rigidly segregated city in being able to enjoy its amenities regardless of race. Courting couples promenaded on the geometrically laid out avenues on the east site under a canopy of clipped trees. Families, on hot summer nights, slept in the site to catch the summer breezes that blew over the escarpment. During World War I the Girl Scouts camped and grew vegetables on the site between North Capitol Street and First Street. Boys played ball games on the east portion where there were fewer manhole covers near Michigan Avenue. They laughed about sometimes falling through the center of a vault to the white sand beneath when a manhole cover had been left open."

During the Corps of Engineers’ ownership, no commercial development of the site occurred. When the National Capital Planning Commission prepared the federal element of its first Comprehensive Plan in 1983, it included McMillan Park as among the "Parks, Open Space and Natural Features" of the city that "should be conserved and whose essential Open Space Character [be] maintained."

The site's future became uncertain, though, in 1986 when the Corps of Engineers declared the property surplus and asked the General Services Administration to dispose of it. GSA iterated its position that open space was not the highest and best use of the property, and insisted on selling the property for mixed commercial development over the objections of the McMillan Park Committee.

The District of Columbia government purchased the site from the federal government in 1987 for $9.3M, in order to facilitate development. Since the time of purchase, the property has remained unused and closed to the public.

== Recent events ==
=== Development proposals ===
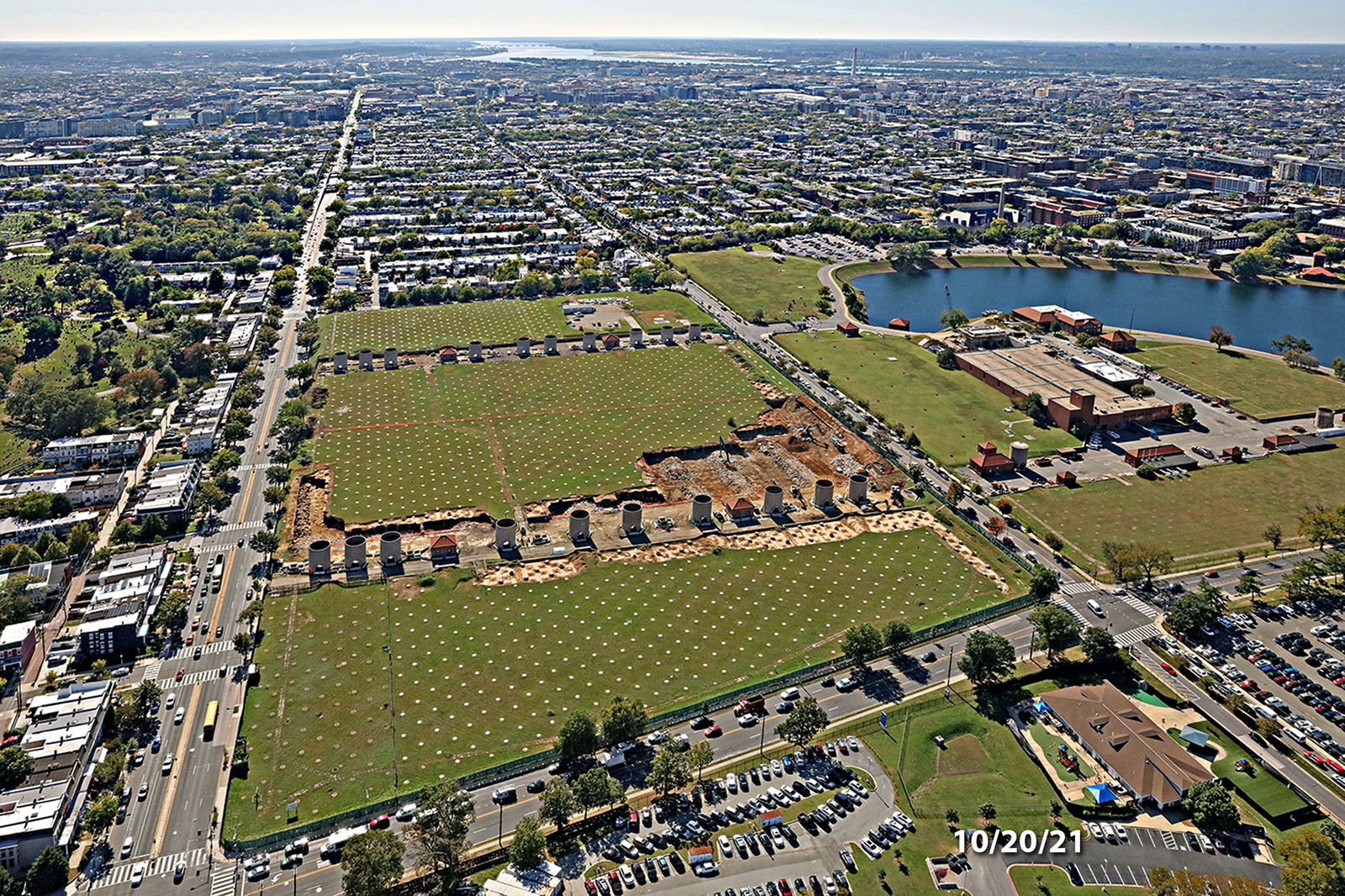
An October 2021 aerial photo of McMillan Sand Filtration Site

The D.C. government began considering the McMillan Sand Filtration Site for commercial and residential development again in 2007. The National Capital Revitalization Corporation (NCRC), a development agency created by the city, selected the site as part of a land swap deal involving Anacostia riverfront property and the construction of the Nationals Park baseball stadium. (The government dissolved the NCRC in 2007 and merged its functions into the Office of the Deputy Mayor for Planning and Economic Development.)

The government selected a development team, Vision McMillan Partners (VMP), in 2007. Their proposal includes a mix of uses, including housing, shopping and office space. The site would also include a network of accessible park space, including 6.25 acres (2.53 ha) on the southern end of the site, a 1-acre healing garden on the north end, and an acre of green space over a preserved cell at the north end.

The VMP proposal has met with opposition from some neighborhood groups. The team has been meeting with the surrounding neighborhoods since before its selection in 2007 and has included neighborhood input in project revisions. The plan was unanimously approved by the Historic Preservation Review Board in May 2016, which will vote on the buildings on the site but not the overall Master Plan for redevelopment.

In 2013 DC Water proposed a plan to use McMillan to provide neighborhood relief of flooding that plagued the Bloomingdale neighborhood, in which the site is situated. The plan calls for the use of two cells to retain water, and to demolish a number of cells in order to provide access to the tunnel they will build on First Street, NW to manage the system.

In 2016, courts sided with community activists and rejected the DC Zoning Commission's approval of a $720 million project to transform the site into retail, office and residential space.

=== City council and court allow development to proceed ===
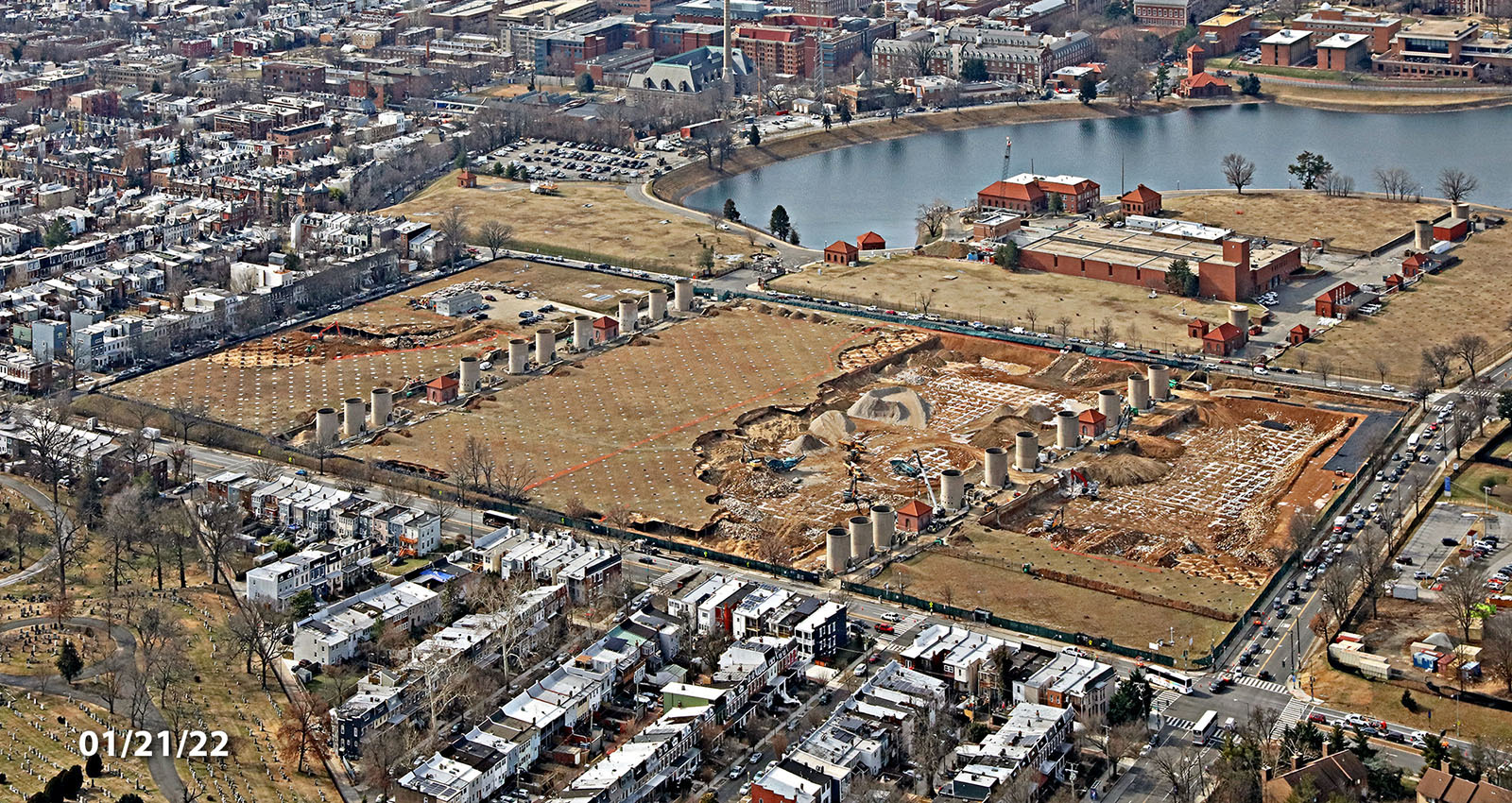
A January 2022 aerial photo of McMillan Sand Filtration Site, showing demolition activity

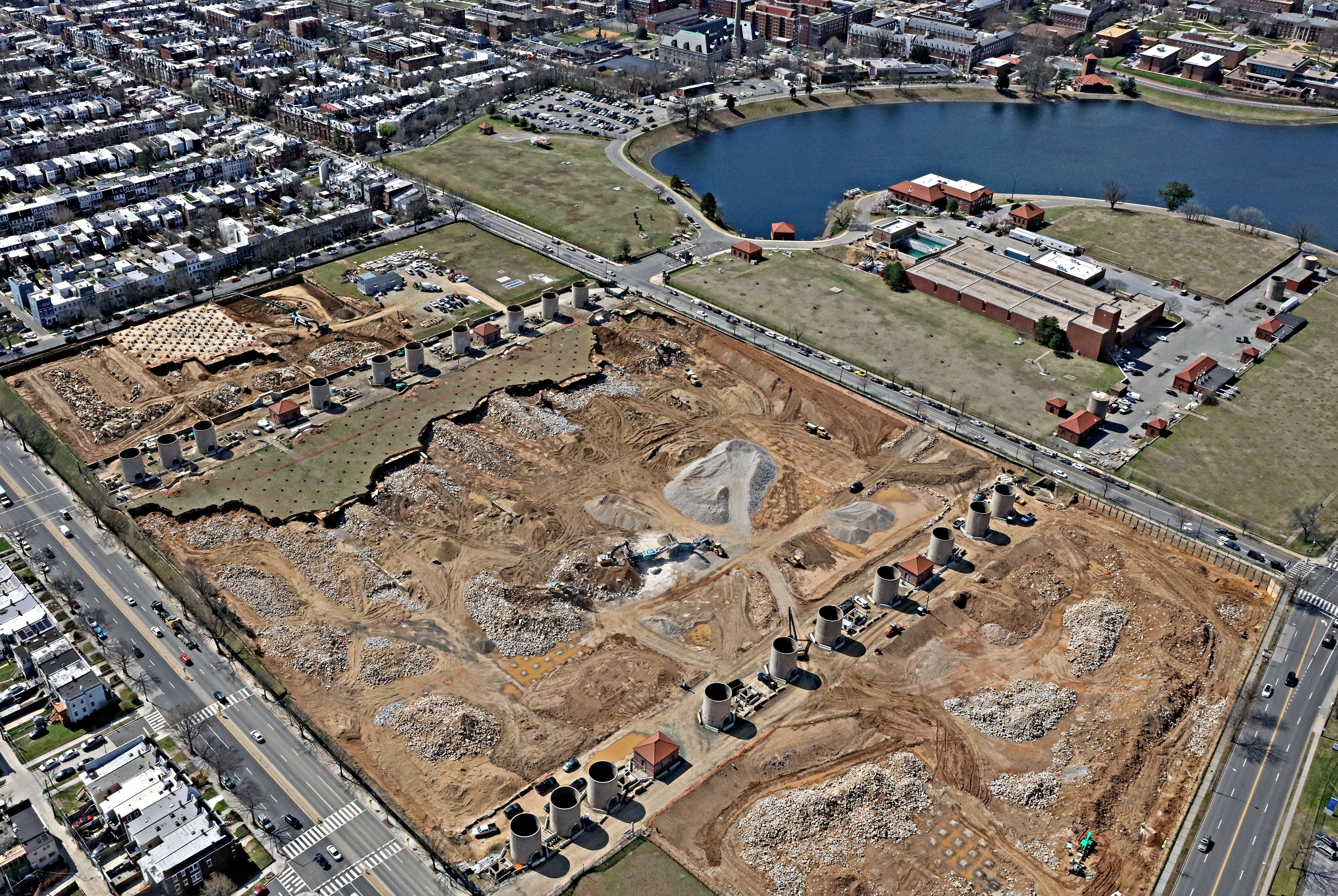
McMillan Sand Restoration Site

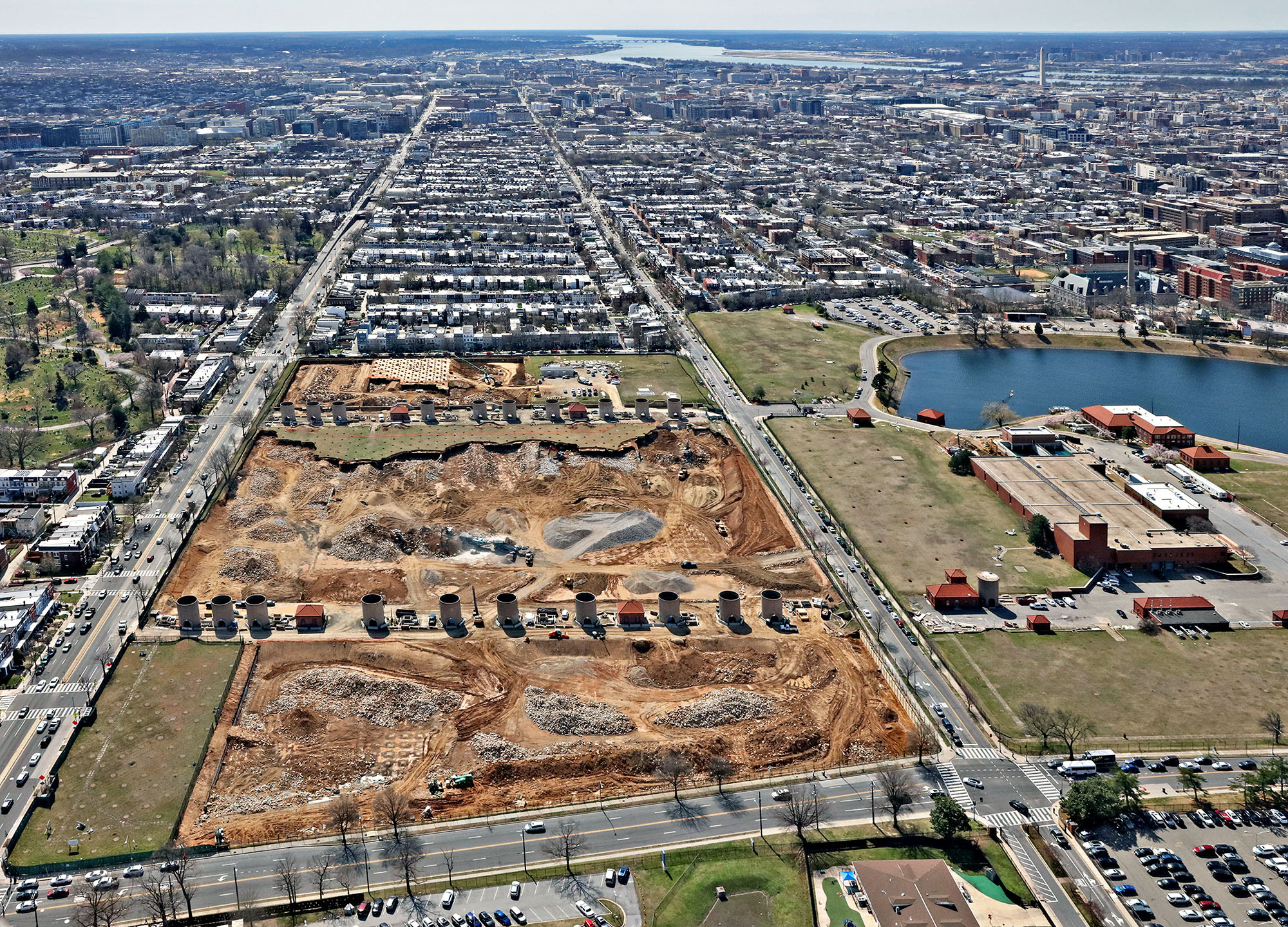
McMillan Sand Restoration Site

In summer 2021 the City Council passed legislation authorizing demolition at the McMillan site. In October 2021 the D.C. Court of Appeals ruled that the proposed development project may proceed pursuant to the legislation. Demolition of the site commenced in October 2021.

In May 2023, the Washington Business Journal reported that the site had been renamed from the "McMillan Sand Filtration Site" to the "Reservoir District." As of January 2024, the site is being developed.

On June 15, 2024 D.C. Mayor Muriel Bowser cut the ribbon at the Reservoir Park Recreation Center at the former McMillan Sand Filtration site. With this ceremony the new 6.2-acre park and recreation center were declared open to the public.

== See also ==
- McMillan Reservoir
