= Metropolitan Baptist Church =

Metropolitan Baptist Church may refer to:

in the United States

(by state then city or town)

- Metropolitan Baptist Church (Washington, D.C.)
- Metropolitan Baptist Church (New York City), NRHP-listed
- Metropolitan Baptist Church (Philadelphia)
