= Lincoln Memorial Reflecting Pool =

Rectangular pool in Washington, D.C.

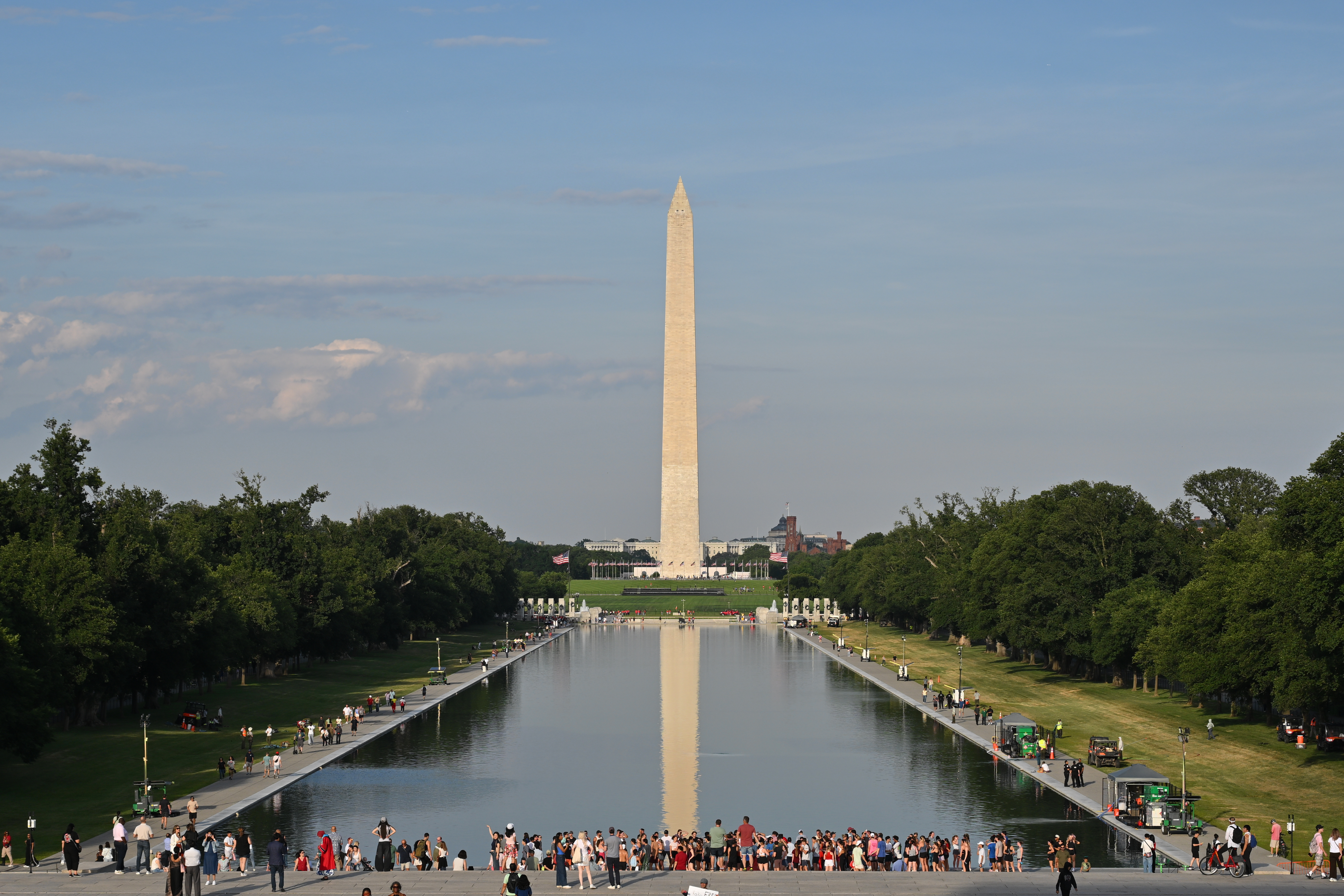
- The Lincoln Memorial Reflecting Pool, facing east towards the Washington Monument on June 17, 2026
- Interactive map of Lincoln Memorial Reflecting Pool
- Location: Washington, D.C., U.S.
- Coordinates: 38°53′21″N 77°02′42″W
- Designer: Henry Bacon
- Builder: Federal government of the United States
- Type: Reflecting Pool
- Material: Granite edging and walkways with a concrete bottom coated in a blue polyurea coating
- Length: 2028 ft
- Width: 167 ft
- Visitors: Around 24 million visitors a year
- Dedicated date: 1922
- Restored date: 2009 under president Barack Obama

The Lincoln Memorial Reflecting Pool is the largest of the many reflecting pools in Washington, D.C. Dedicated in 1922, it is a 2,028-by-167-foot (618 by 51 m) concrete-bottomed roughly rectangular pool that as of 2012 holds about 4 million US gallons (15,000 m^{3}) of water. The pool is located on the National Mall, in between the Lincoln Memorial and the Washington Monument.

The Reflecting Pool attracts 24 million visitors annually. It is lined by walking paths and trees on both sides. Depending on the viewer's vantage point, it reflects the Washington Monument, the Lincoln Memorial, the Mall's trees, and the sky.

Many marches and events have been held at the Reflecting Pool, such as the March on Washington and the Commitment March. A celebration of the then soon to occur inauguration of Barack Obama named the We Are One: The Obama Inaugural Celebration at the Lincoln Memorial was held in the area on January 18, 2009.

The pool was originally built with a bottom of asphalt and tile, and was supplied from the city's drinking water supply, and in its initial plans was going to be cruciform, although this never came to fruition. Starting in 2009, the pool was completely rebuilt and the bottom was replaced with concrete slabs supported by timber pilings. The Reflecting Pool was also changed to be supplied with water from the Tidal Basin, instead of the earlier-used D.C. potable water. The pool was planned to be used as an ice rink when originally built, but is no longer used in that manner.

In 2026, the pool was resurfaced at the order of president Donald Trump with a blue polyurea coating, and a nanobubbler filtration system was added. After a few days, the coating began to peel and the Reflecting Pool sustained an algal bloom. Trump claimed, without evidence, that acts of vandalism caused the coating to peel. The U.S. Justice Department later admitted in a legal filing that the renovation had been "hasty and botched", and the problems were not caused by vandalism.

== Description ==
The Lincoln Memorial Reflecting Pool was designed by Henry Bacon. The groundbreaking for the Lincoln Memorial and the pool was on February 12, 1914, and they were dedicated on May 30, 1922. During construction, the pool was nicknamed by some sources as a "water mirror". When originally constructed, it was approximately 2,028 feet (618 m) long and 167 feet (51 m) wide. It was originally planned to be used as an ice rink in the winter, but is no longer used for that purpose. It was completely rebuilt between 2010 and 2012. The pool was originally built with an asphalt and tile bottom, but was replaced with concrete in the 2009 restoration. The nearby walkways and the rim of the Reflecting Pool are made of granite.

Before the 2009 restoration the Reflecting Pool held 6.75 million U.S. gallons (25.6 million liters) of water. According to former U.S. secretary of the interior Ken Salazar, it now holds about 4 million U.S. gallons (15 million liters) of water.

== History ==
=== Initial creation ===
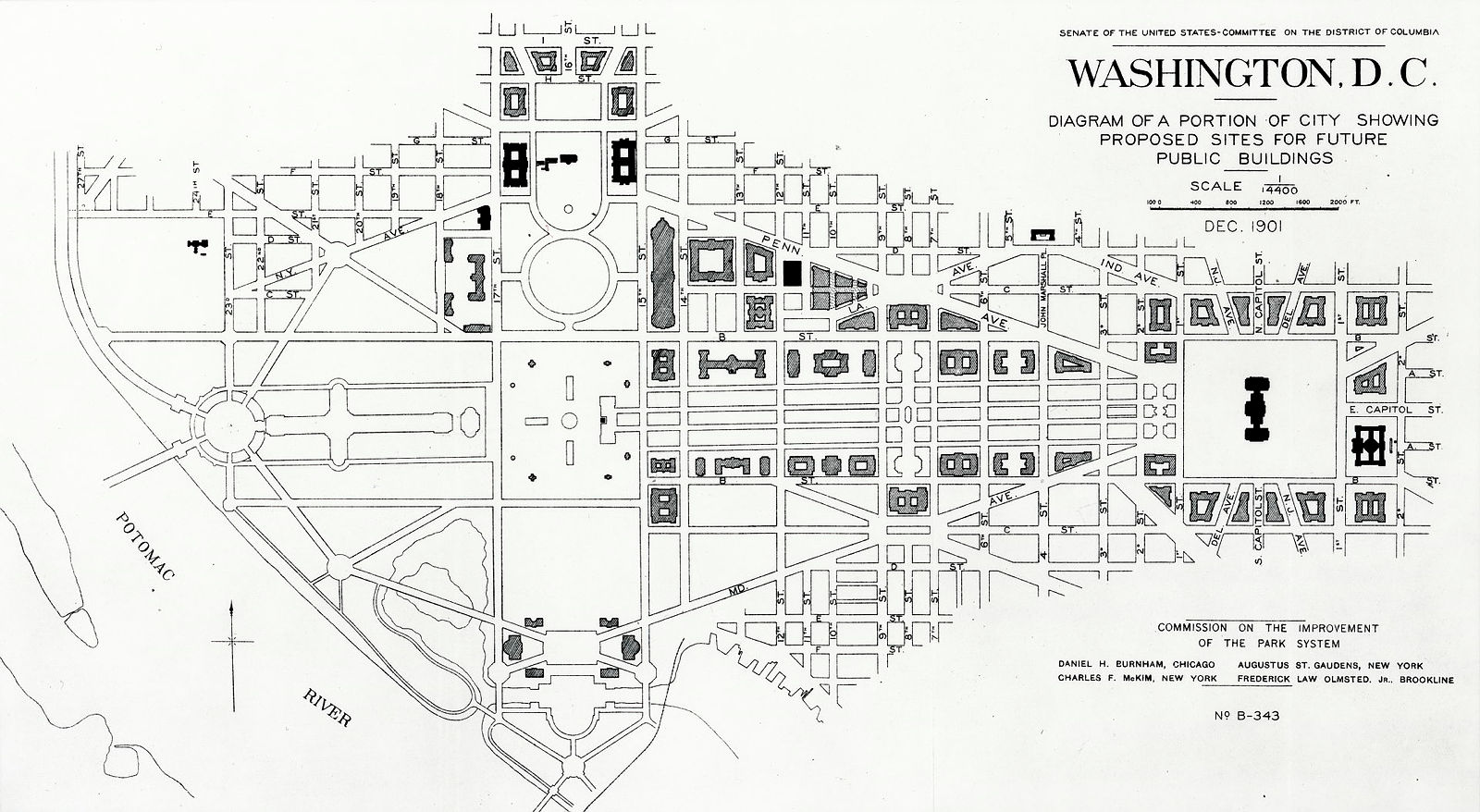
A diagram of the McMillan Plan

==== Planning ====
The Lincoln Memorial Reflecting Pool was part of the McMillan Plan, which was used as a blueprint for most federal government buildings in Washington D.C. It was inspired by canals in Versailles, France and the reflecting pools at the Taj Mahal in India. The Reflecting Pool was originally designed to be cruciform with round edges, with a smaller secondary pool, the Rainbow Pool, situated between it and the Washington Monument. The two small arms of the cross for the Reflecting Pool were removed from the plan due to the presence of nearby US Navy buildings. These structures, including one that housed munitions, obstructed the area for the proposed excavation work. The round edges of the pool were also changed to be square.

Because the Reflecting Pool and the Rainbow Pool were built on reclaimed marshland, various steps were taken to prevent the pools from settling in a way that would cause them to appear unequal. These steps included supporting parts of each pool with bedrock that was deep below the ground, and building part of the pools in a way to account for eventual settlement.

Systems that could be used to drain and fill the water within each pool in a 24 hour period were also planned.

==== Construction ====
The construction of both pools was delayed until 1919 due to World War I. Construction finally began in 1922.

The hole for the Lincoln Memorial Reflecting Pool to be built inside of was dug out using steam shovels that were carried using a modular railway that would be built, disassembled and rebuilt to move with the steam shovels as they excavated the area.

The drainage system for the pool used a 36 in (91 cm) concrete pipe in the middle of the pool connected to a sump pump 450 feet (140 m) away, that was later connected to the Tidal Basin. The initial plan to pump water from the Tidal Basin directly into the pool was also abandoned for D.C's (at that time) new potable water supply.

The Reflecting Pool was made level using 366 wood and concrete pilings that reached down to the bedrock below the pool, and a large amount of T-beams were put on top of the piles with the pool's granite coping built on top of the beams. The bottom of the pool was connected to the edges of the pool using concrete slabs that were hinged to the pool bottom.

According to an article from The Military Engineer, the Reflecting Pool's bottom was made of compressed cinders saturated with various grades of road oil, (Note: Road oil is a slow-curing oil used in road repair and construction as a surfacant or for dust control. It comes in multiple grades.) with a layer of sand. A multiple-layered waterproof lining for the pool was made from a combination of asphalt-saturated wool felt (for the top and bottom layers) and two plies of an open-mesh cotton fabric in the middle, along with "three heavy moppings" of a "high-grade waterproofing asphalt". It had to be repaired while being constructed following heavy rain which disrupted the work, causing the fabric to wrinkle and become uneven.

A planned mastic asphalt layer was ultimately completed with a hand roller after it was discovered that use of a power roller had caused damage to the waterproofed lining. Methane gas from the cinder base was later found to have been trapped when the hot mastic asphalt layers were applied, causing blisters to appear. Unable to complete their work given these conditions, the contractor offered a different approach, and instead used roofing slate coated in asphalt as a replacement, along with cement tiles laid in asphalt along the apron.

=== 2009 restoration ===
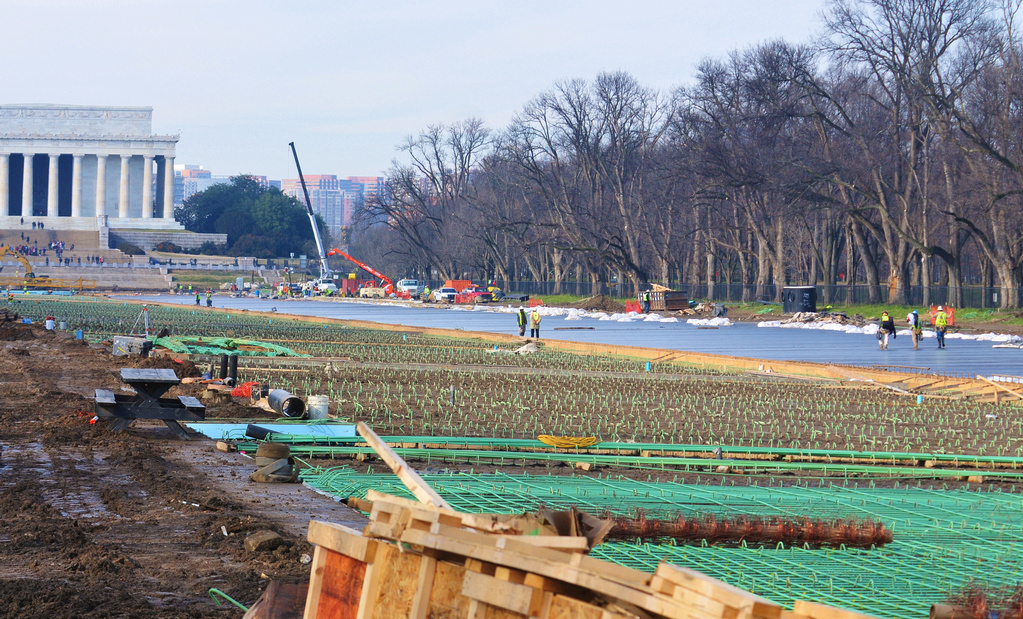
The Lincoln Memorial Reflecting Pool during the 2010 reconstruction

Using funding from the American Recovery and Reinvestment Act of 2009, the National Park Service reconstructed the Lincoln Memorial Reflecting Pool. The project was managed by the Louis Berger Group. Construction on the 18-month, $30.74 million project began in November 2010. In May 2011, workers began sinking the first of 2,133 wood pilings into a 40-foot-deep (12-meter) layer of soft, marshy river clay and some dredged-up material atop bedrock to support a new pool. The pool's water supply system was updated to eliminate stagnant water by circulating water from the Tidal Basin; the pool was formerly filled using potable water from the city. Paved walking paths were added to the north and south sides of the pool to replace worn grass and to prevent erosion. The pool reopened on August 31, 2012.

==== Post-restoration operation ====
Within weeks of the pool's reopening in 2012, it had to be drained and cleaned for $100,000 due to algae in the pool. The algae growth almost completely covered the surface of the pool. The National Park Service said that, using an ozone disinfectant system installed during the restoration, they would double the amount of algae-killing ozone in the pool in an effort to control future outbreaks. In 2013, construction on the National World War II Memorial damaged the eastern end of the Reflecting Pool. National Park Service workers closed the eastern 30 feet (9 meters) of the pool in August 2015 to repair the basin, work that was completed in the summer of 2016. The Reflecting Pool was completely drained in June 2017 to control a schistosome outbreak. The parasite, which causes swimmer's itch, infected the snails that inhabited the pool and ultimately killed more than 80 ducks and ducklings in a few weeks during spring 2017.

=== 2026 renovations ===
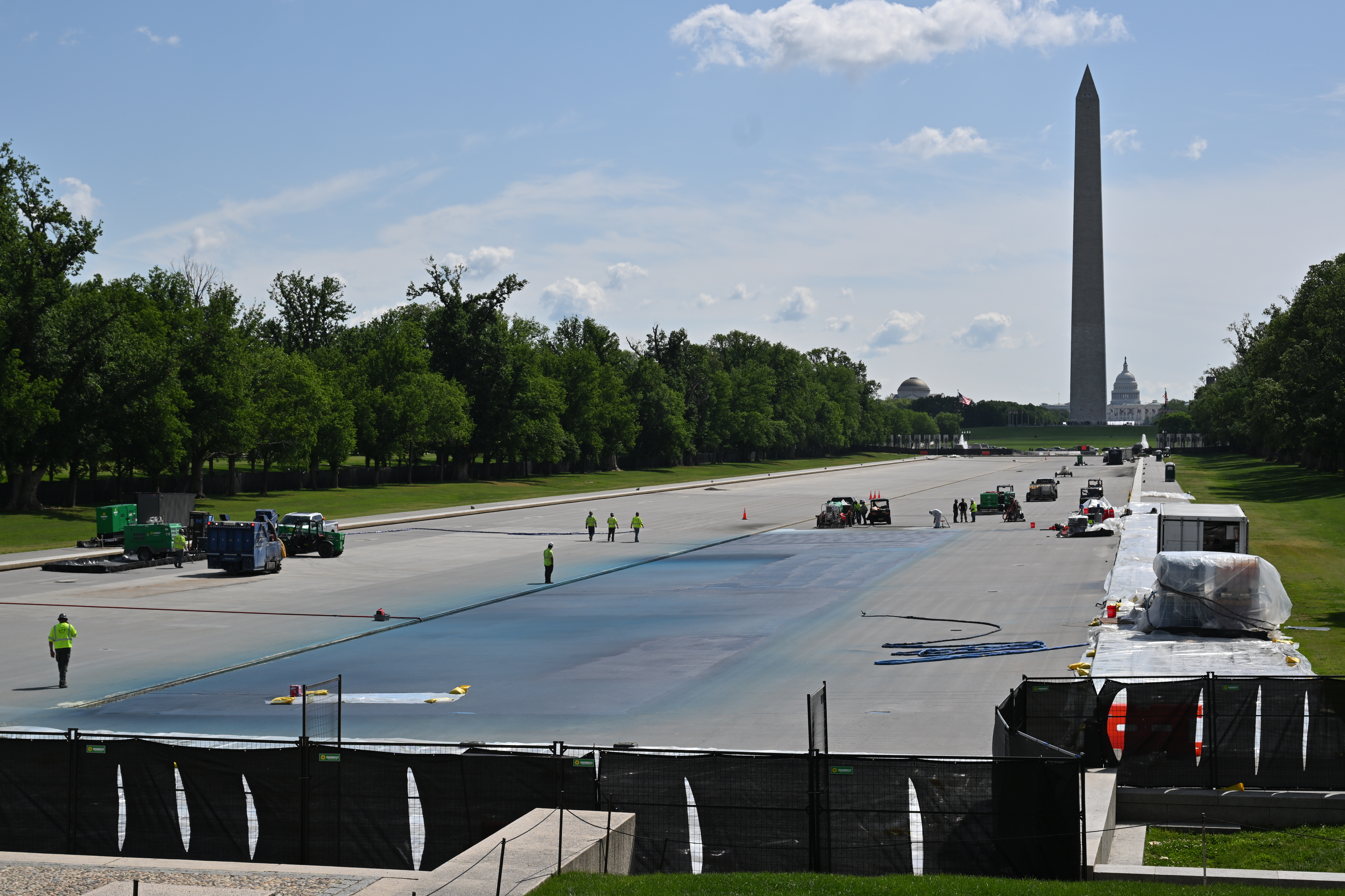
Resurfacing of the Reflecting Pool, April 2026

In April 2026, U.S. president Donald Trump announced that the resurfacing of the concrete bottom of the pool, in a color he called "American flag blue", (Note: The name of the color used in official American flags is "Old Glory Blue".) had begun. He said that the renovations would take about a week and cost about $1.5 million. There was no review by federal agencies, opportunity for public comment, or congressional approval for the project.

Atlantic Industrial Coatings (AIC), was provided its first federal no-bid contract to fix leaks from the joints in the Reflecting Pool and to waterproof the pool's concrete bottom. Trump originally stated that AIC had previously performed work for him, but later retracted that claim, stating instead that the contract had been awarded by the Department of the Interior. The companies Creative Polymers and Rhino Linings were responsible for providing the polyurea liner, which was to be installed by Atlantic Industrial Coatings. According to the president of Creative Polymers, delivery of the final product was complicated by supply shortages due to US tariffs on importation of resins from China. The project also included a new nanobubbler water purification system installed by the company Greenwater Services, which is owned by a neighbor of Trump's at Mar-a-Lago; the company also secured a no-bid contract for the work. The contractor who had previously renovated the pool declined the Trump administration's offer to do the new renovations because, according to two employees interviewed by CNN, the 2026 project was "unfeasible".

On May 7, after the pool was coated and before it was filled with water, the presidential motorcade drove down the pool basin and then Trump got out and gave a statement to reporters. NBC and Forbes showed footage of the cars leaving tire marks in what appeared to be a patch of wet paint. According to Snopes, "It is unclear whether the motorcade may have contributed to the paint peeling off a month later."

On May 8, the Interior Department said they planned to pay $13.1 million for the project.

On May 11, nonprofit group the Cultural Landscape Foundation sued the Trump administration to prevent the project from continuing.

==== Post-renovations operation ====
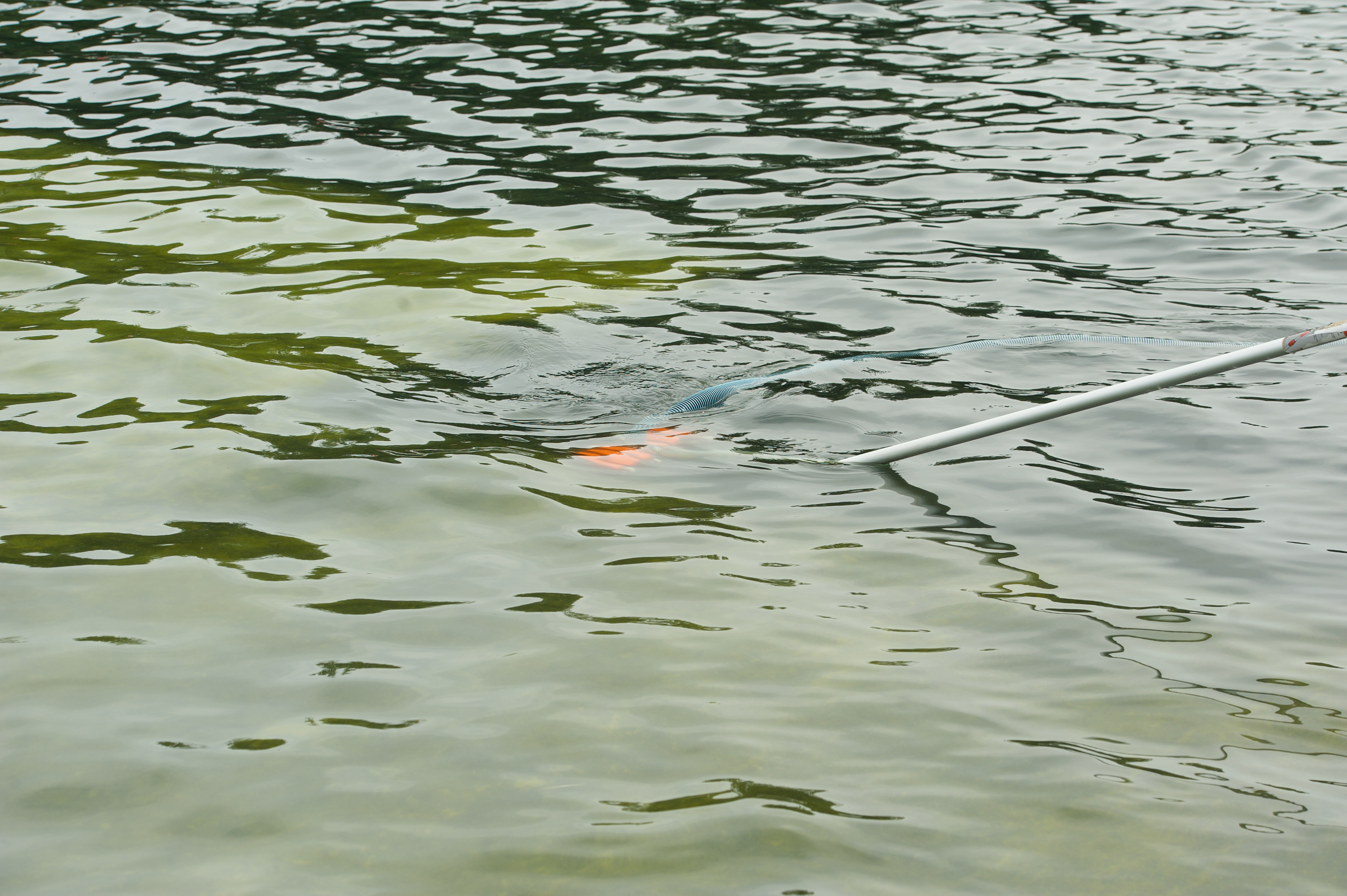
Algae being cleaned from the Reflecting Pool using a vacuum in June 2026

The work was completed on June 5. Within days of the refilling of the pool, algae bloomed in the pool. National Park Service workers poured hydrogen peroxide into the pool and manually vacuumed the pool in an effort to remove the algae. The New York Times spoke to employees of Greenwater Services, who said the National Park Service had asked them to remove the nanobubbling purifier systems from the pool's rim for Trump's UFC Championship set on the White House lawn. According to the same employees; by the time they were reinstalled 36 hours later, the algae was in full bloom.

Scientific American identified the blue thick-film elastomeric coating as a brand of polyurea coating from Rhino Linings called Pipeliner 5000. According to two experts in elastomeric coating interviewed by WBAL-TV, this polyurea coating has been frequently used before in water features to create a waterproof barrier as it cures quickly and remains flexible. As it began to peel off the bottom of the pool soon after the completion of the project, various engineers and pool experts interviewed by the American media postulated that the peeling might have been caused by a variety of factors, such as, but not limited to: the resurfacant used, heat, UV radiation, the presidential motorcade driving over the pool after its completion, the use of hydrogen peroxide in the pool and the adhesion of the coating used to granite. In addition to the Pipeliner sealant, AIC used Rhino 406 epoxy primer and Rhino 11-35 polyurea.

A National Park Service engineer emailed the Trump administration on June 11 to report that the liner was peeling.

Trump claimed in late June that both the algae and the peeling of the new material in the pool were caused by vandalism; multiple media outlets reported at the time that there was no evidence for these claims. A Trump administration official later told CBS News that, in regards to the alleged vandalism, 14 police reports were filed, with five citations issued and five arrests made, including that of Olympic athlete David Hearn. Hearn was indicted by a grand jury on a federal charge that he had, in the words of US attorney Jeanine Pirro, "woefully destroyed property". He pled not guilty.

On June 23, Trump announced that the pool would be drained for repairs. Atlantic Industry Coatings also confirmed this. On June 24, during the aforementioned Cultural Landscape Foundation lawsuit, a statement on the so-called vandalism was published by Frank Lands, Deputy Director for Operations at the National Park Service. In the statement, Lands alleged that on June 9, the United States Park Police responded to a National Park Service report of vandalism to the pool, which included the reported cutting of "caulk over the foam sealant" and destruction "of delaminating surface material". The Trump administration later deployed National Guard soldiers to the pool, and established surveillance to counter possible vandalism.

A July 16 report from The Washington Post showed photos correlating the areas where the coating failed with seams between applications of various coatings. The records assembled by the newspaper indicated that in some cases the contractor violated manufacturer instructions as to the minimum or maximum times between coats as well.

At the end of July, the United States Department of Justice and Jeanine Pirro admitted that the damage was the result of a "hasty and botched" renovation, and that the contractor had performed a "flawed installation". Prosecutors found "extensive peeling of the lining throughout the Reflecting Pool" which was due to poor quality-control and was "not vandalism". The DOJ moved to have the case against Hearn dismissed. Days later a judge granted this request, dropping the felony charge against Hearn.

The Justice Department said they had made "dozens and dozens" of requests for evidence but claimed that the Department of the Interior withheld information from federal prosecutors which demonstrated the problematic contracting work, and instead falsely blamed vandals. The next day, Trump wrote on Truth Social that he disagreed "100%" with Pirro's decision to drop the charges against Hearn, restating his claims about vandalism but admitting that other factors were in play. Within days of the initial dismissal of the DOJ's case, prosecutors filed a nolle prosequi, resulting in dropped misdemeanor charges and dismissed cases against three other individuals who were accused of vandalizing the Reflecting Pool. The case against Hearn was ultimately dismissed with prejudice several weeks later, meaning that felony charges cannot be refiled. The judge wrote: "While the government wishes to hold open the possibility of the development of evidence that would support a future prosecution, its own representations make plain that such a possibility is ... simply fanciful".

==== Aftermath ====
Pirro's decision infuriated Trump, according to multiple people who spoke to the New York Times with knowledge of White House developments. The Times reported that Pirro had privately come to view Secretary of the Interior Doug Burgum as an "incompetent liar" for his failure to oversee the renovation project and promotion of the vandalism narrative. She concluded that the prosecutions would likely have been thrown out by a judge. Trump maintained that Pirro had "folded like an umbrella" and again falsely insisted the pool had been damaged by vandals. During an Oval Office meeting in early August, Pirro directly confronted Burgum, accusing him of misleading the president. According to The New York Times, she "made the case that Mr. Burgum had promoted a self-serving cover story to conceal his own missteps." The Times surmised that, uncharacteristically for Trump's appointees, she may have felt empowered to cross him by dint of her independently established career, as opposed to one that relies on Trump's benefaction to sustain.

Atlantic Industrial Coatings produced a report on August 6 that identified 85 points of failure, including an additional 88 instances of damage caused by the Army Corps of Engineers during strength testing. No cases of vandalism were documented. It further admitted in an August 14 report that the lining had peeled due to its own errors. Atlantic Industrial Coatings provided more detail in yet another follow-up report on September 2. The documents showed that workers did not use enough primer, and that incompatible chemicals were used during the layering process which caused blistering. The New York Times noted that this was an "untested approach" designed in part by a manager of a Trump Organization golf club in New Jersey.

On November 2, the Reflecting Pool reopened to the public and Trump delivered his closing argument for the 2026 United States midterm elections at a small press event held in front of it. His remarks mostly focused on celebrating his D.C. construction projects and he acknowledged a challenging political environment.

== Events ==
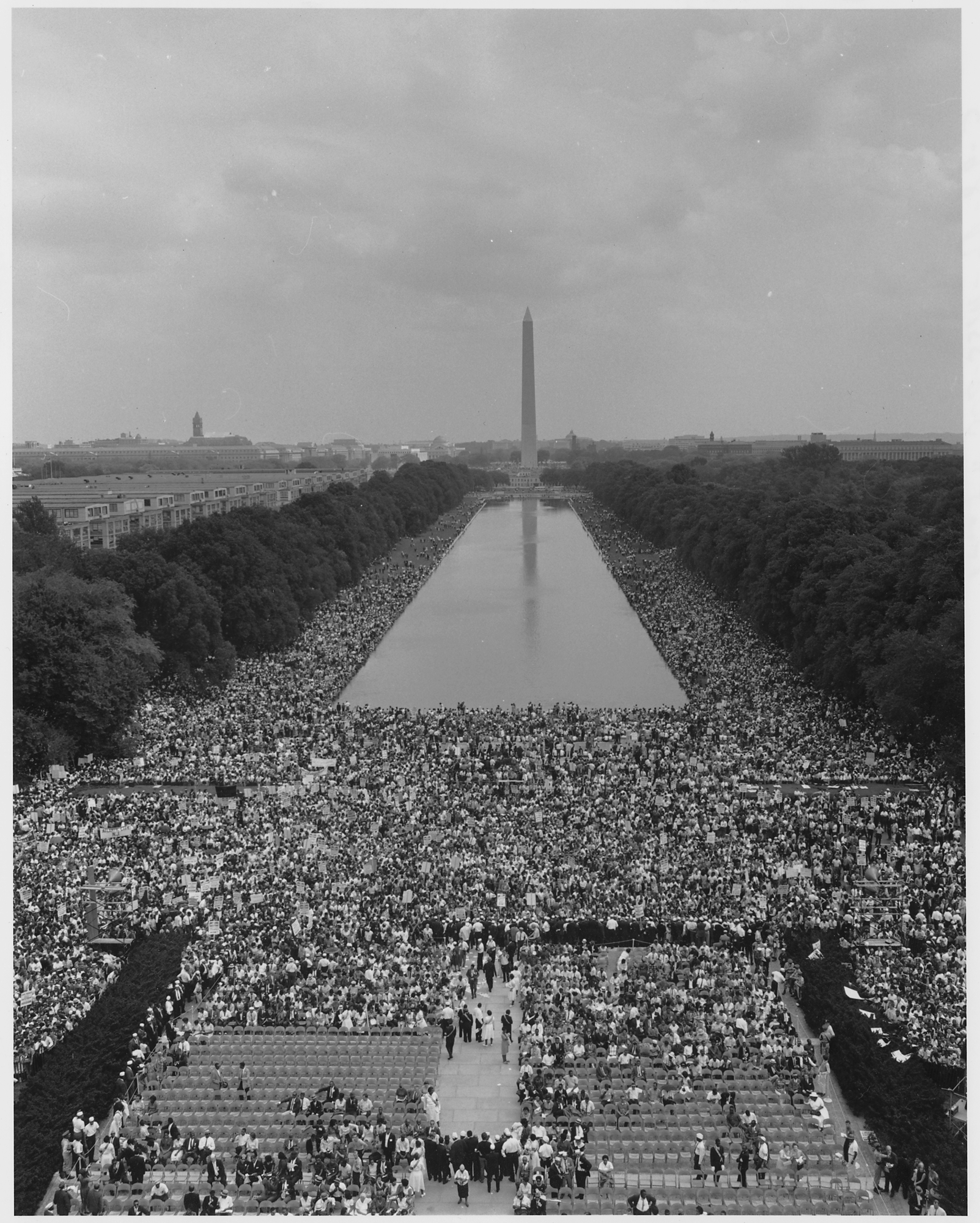
Civil rights movement March on Washington, August 28, 1963

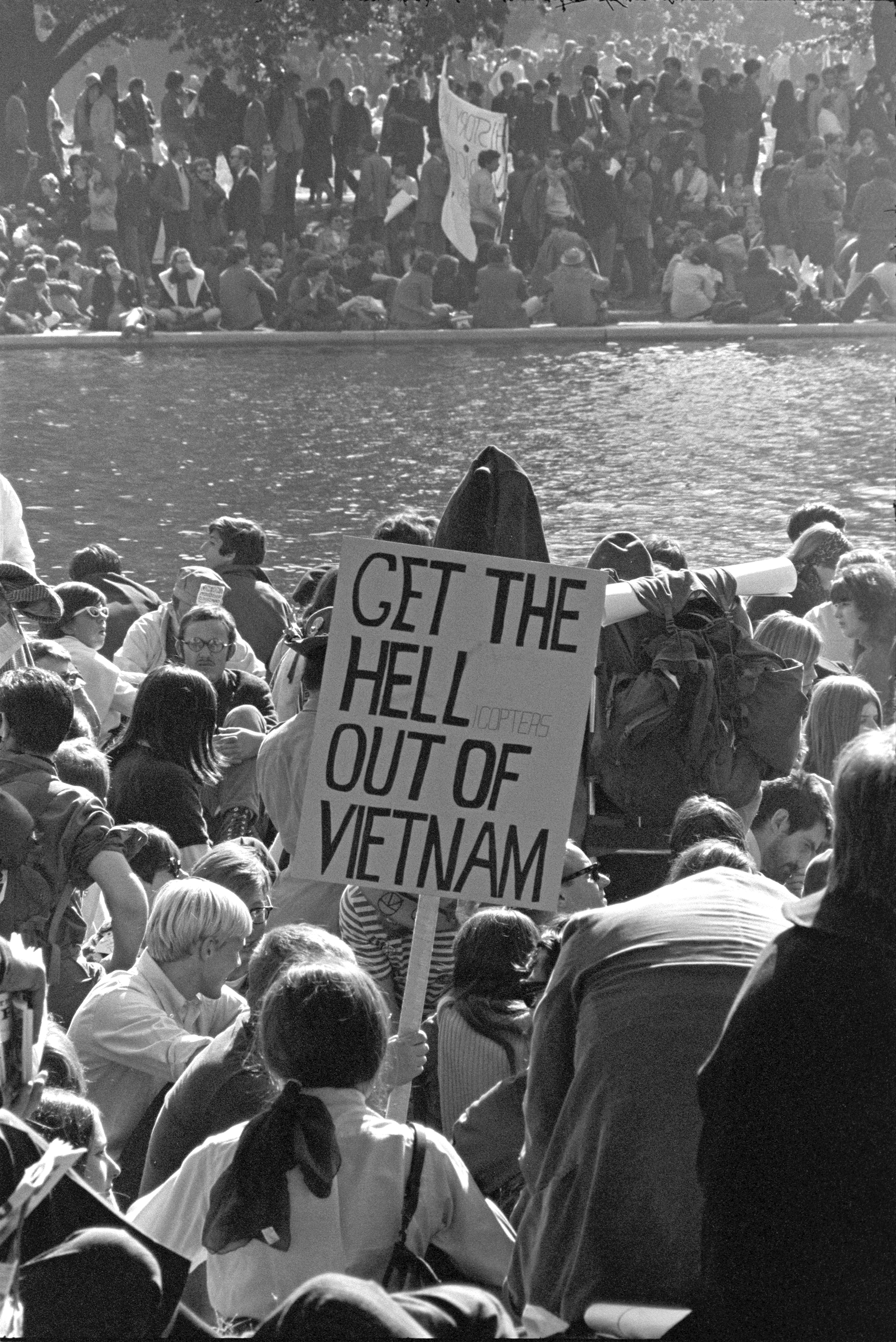
Anti-Vietnam War protesters at the pool for the March on the Pentagon on October 21, 1967

The area of and around the Lincoln Memorial Reflecting Pool has been the site of many historic events, including:

- In 1939, singer Marian Anderson was denied permission to perform at Constitution Hall in Washington because she was an African American. Instead, an open-air concert was held on Easter Sunday at the Lincoln Memorial and the surrounding area with a crowd of over 75,000 people.
- On August 28, 1963, the March on Washington used the area for its civil rights movement rally. It was there that Martin Luther King Jr. gave his "I Have a Dream" speech, delivered to a crowd of 250,000 people.
- On October 21, 1967, 100,000 anti-Vietnam War protesters met at the pool and memorial to begin the March on the Pentagon.
- In 2009, We Are One: The Obama Inaugural Celebration at the Lincoln Memorial was held, with a crowd of 400,000 people.
- On August 28, 2013, the 50th anniversary of the March on Washington and Martin Luther King Jr.'s "I Have A Dream" speech was commemorated by an all-day event. The event featured various speakers including then president Barack Obama and John Lewis, the only living speaker from the original rally.
- On July 4, 2019, President Trump hosted the 2019 Salute to America, an event to celebrate United States Independence Day on the National Mall, which included the presentation of U.S. military vehicles, as well as flyovers of military aircraft. President Trump also made an address on the steps of the Lincoln Memorial.
- On August 28, 2020, the Commitment March: Get Your Knee Off Our Necks was organized and held by Rev. Al Sharpton and Martin Luther King III. The march came in the wake of the 2020 Black Lives Matter Protests. Speakers included Sharpton, King, then vice-president nominee Kamala Harris, as well as family members of George Floyd, Breonna Taylor, Ahmaud Arbery, Trayvon Martin, and other victims of racial violence.
- On January 19, 2021, then president-elect Joe Biden and then vice president-elect Kamala Harris held a memorial honoring the 400,000 Americans who had by that time died in the COVID-19 pandemic in the United States.

== In popular culture ==
The Reflecting Pool was featured in the following films:

- The 1939 film Mr. Smith Goes to Washington
- The 1994 film Forrest Gump
- The 2004 film National Treasure
- The 2005 film Wedding Crashers
- The 2011 film Transformers: Dark of the Moon
- The 2014 film Captain America: The Winter Soldier
- The 2017 film Spider-Man: Homecoming
- The 2020 film Wonder Woman 1984

== See also ==
- Capitol Reflecting Pool
- Rainbow Pool
