= Union Square (Washington, D.C.) =

Public plaza in Washington, D.C.

Coordinates: 38°53′23″N 77°00′49″W

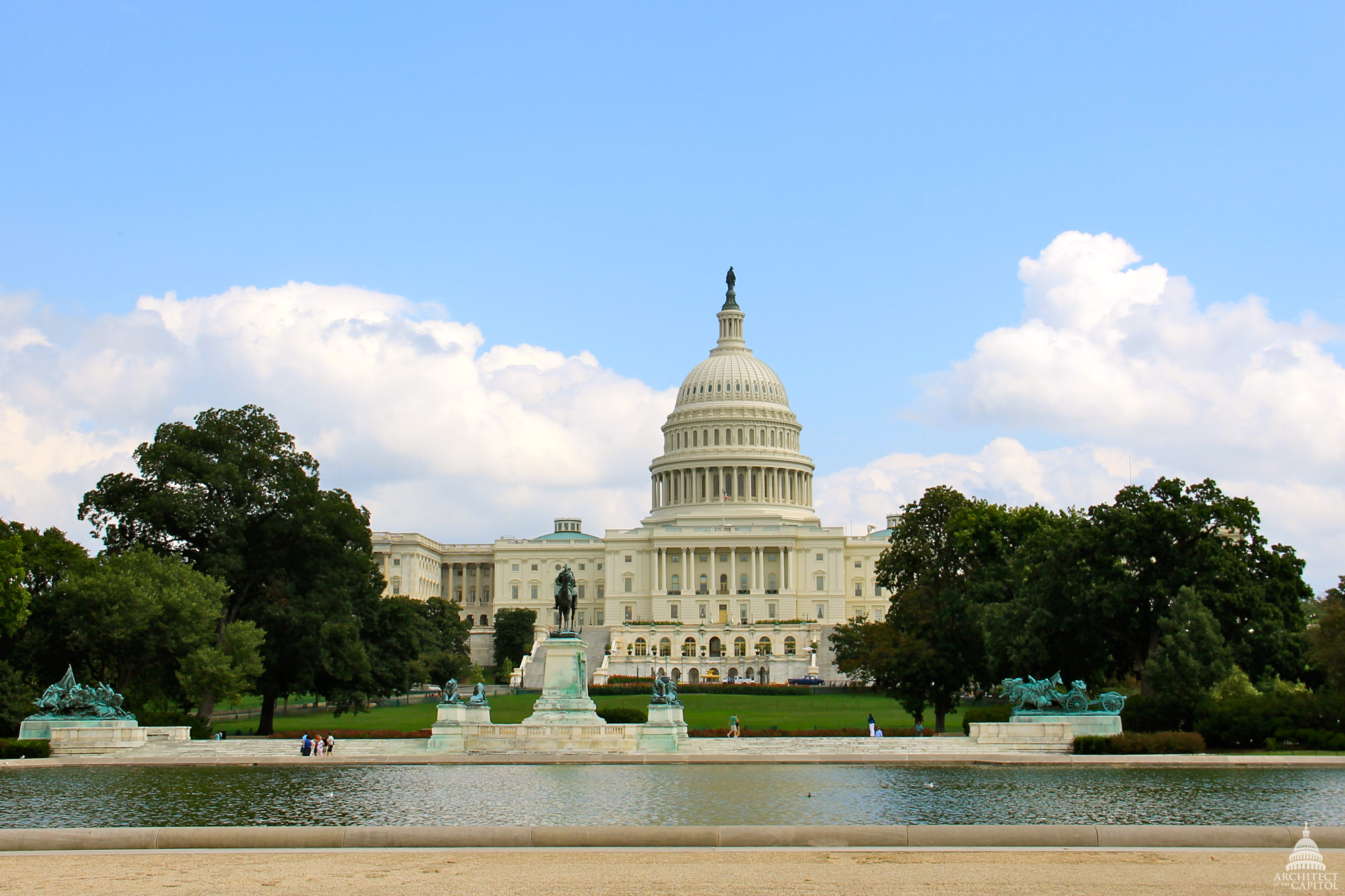
Union Square, Washington, D.C., in 2012

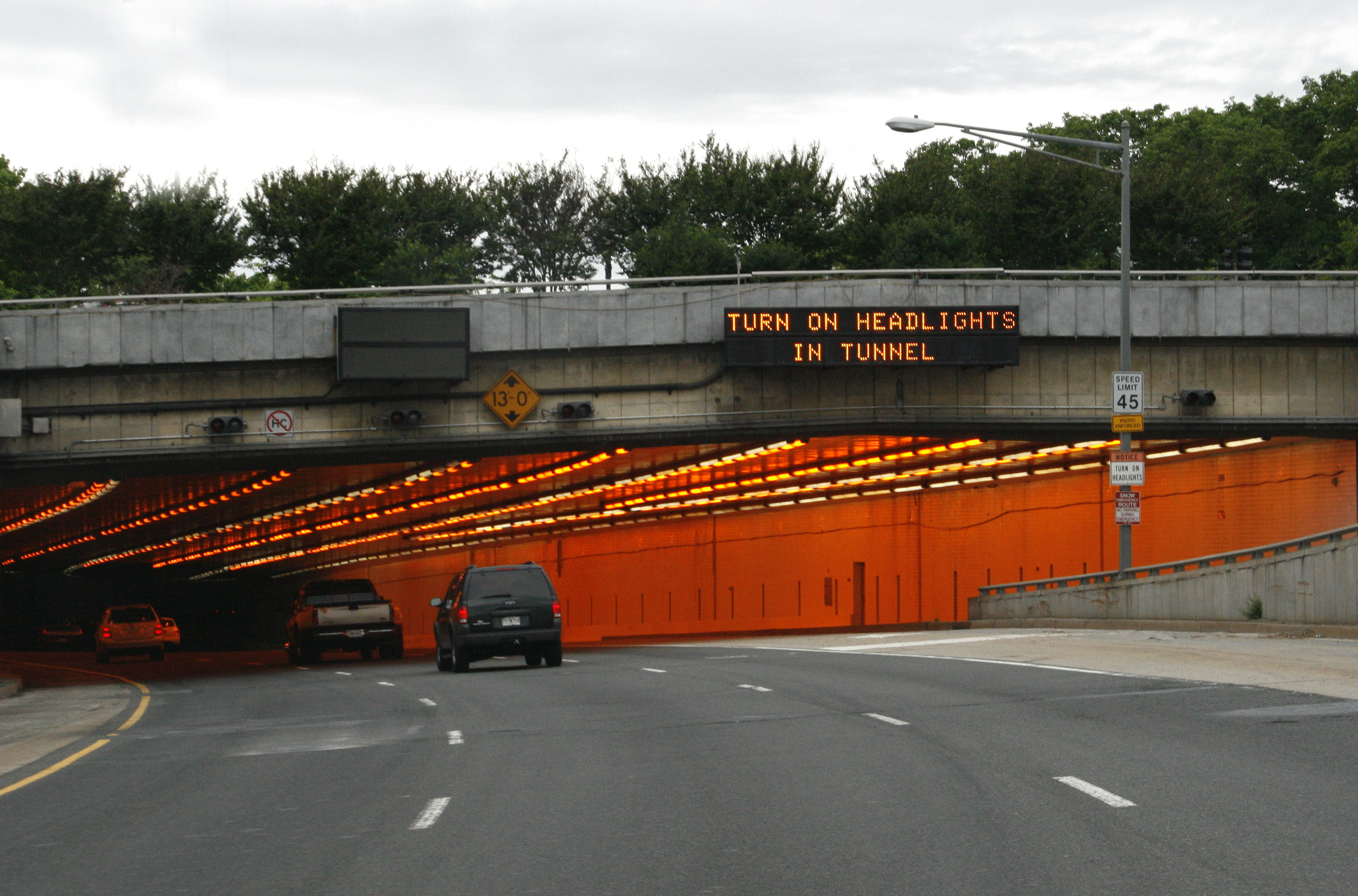
Vehicles entering the Third Street Tunnel, located under Union Square (2009)

Union Square is an 11-acre public plaza at the foot of Capitol Hill in Washington, D.C., United States. It encompasses the Ulysses S. Grant Memorial (1924) and the 6-acre Capitol Reflecting Pool (1971) and is just west of the United States Capitol building. Views differ as to whether the Square is just east of the National Mall or is itself the eastern end.

Interstate 395 transits the Third Street Tunnel just beneath Union Square. The George Gordon Meade Memorial (1927) formerly stood in the northwest section of Union Square; that memorial now stands near the intersection of Constitution Avenue and Pennsylvania Avenue, NW.

== History ==
The area constituting Union Square was originally part of the U.S. Capitol complex, but beginning in the 1930s the National Park Service assumed jurisdiction over the site. In 2012 the Trust for the National Mall selected Seattle-based landscape architects Gustafson Guthrie Nichol (GGN) and New York-based architects Davis Brody Bond (DBB) for the redesign of Union Square. The winning design was judged on flexibility, sustainability, and creativity of their design and how well it reflected the established vision and design influences of this historic setting.

However, the 112th United States Congress enacted the Legislative Branch Appropriations Act, 2012, which transferred to the Architect of the Capitol the NPS "property which is bounded on the north by Pennsylvania Avenue Northwest, on the east by First Street Northwest and First Street Southwest, on the south by Maryland Avenue Southwest, and on the west by Third Street Southwest and Third Street Northwest".

The Act removed Union Square from NPS jurisdiction. The transfer of ownership occasioned some controversy as the NPS and the Trust for The National Mall had planned to enhance the area to accommodate political demonstrations, gatherings and entertainment events. The NPS expressed surprise at the move and some advocates for protest groups complained, asserting that the Architect of the Capitol and the United States Capitol Police (who were now responsible for security) were likely to be less tactful and accommodating to demonstrators than the Park Police. A Washington Post writer stated: "Although definitions of what constitutes the [National] Mall vary, the [2011] provision, in a sense, moves its easternmost boundary west — from First Street to Third Street."
