= Rainbow Pool =

Reflecting Pool on the National Mall in Washington D.C., United States

Coordinates: 38°53′21.83″N 77°2′25.87″W

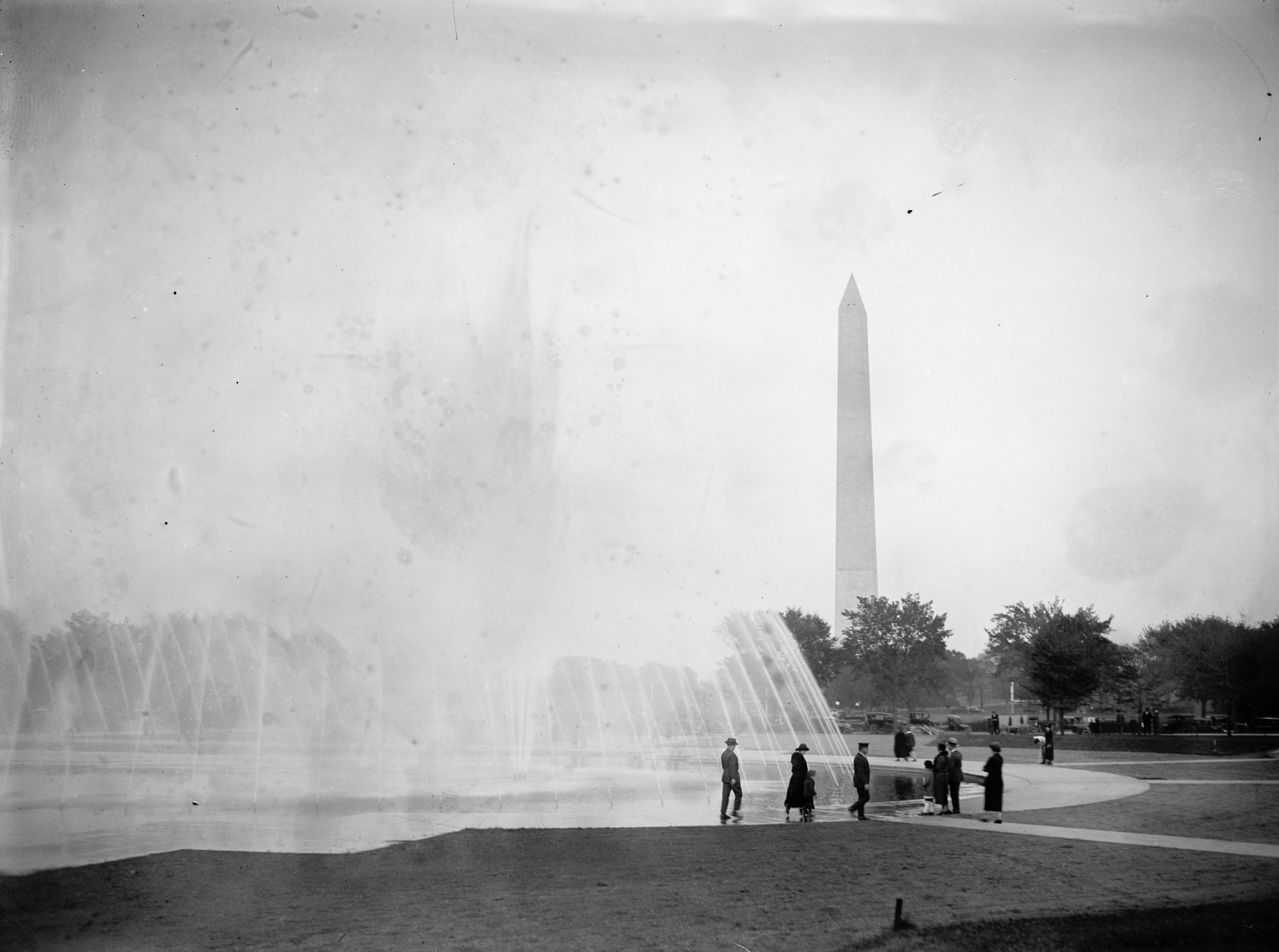
Rainbow Pool c. 1924

The Rainbow Pool was a reflecting pool located on the National Mall in Washington D.C., USA. It was designed by landscape architect Frederick Law Olmsted Jr., and was situated between the Lincoln Memorial Reflecting Pool (to the west), and 17th Street NW (to the east). The pool was renamed the Rainbow Pool on October 15, 1924, after it was noticed that its 124 nozzles created a "perfect rainbow" when turned on.

In 2001 it was integrated into the National World War II Memorial, which features the pool located in roughly the same spot. The builders of the National World War II Memorial asserted that the memorial would not destroy the Rainbow pool; rather it would be sunk lower into the ground to better fit the structure of the World War II Memorial. This was a controversial development, as the Rainbow Pool had a central, visible location between the Washington Monument and Lincoln Memorial. The debate over the World War II Memorial's occupation of the space had to be resolved by legislation from the U.S. Congress in 2001 which allowed the building of the memorial to continue.

== See also ==
- Capitol Reflecting Pool
- Lincoln Memorial Reflecting Pool
