= Commitment March: Get Your Knee Off Our Necks =

2020 event in Washington, D.C.

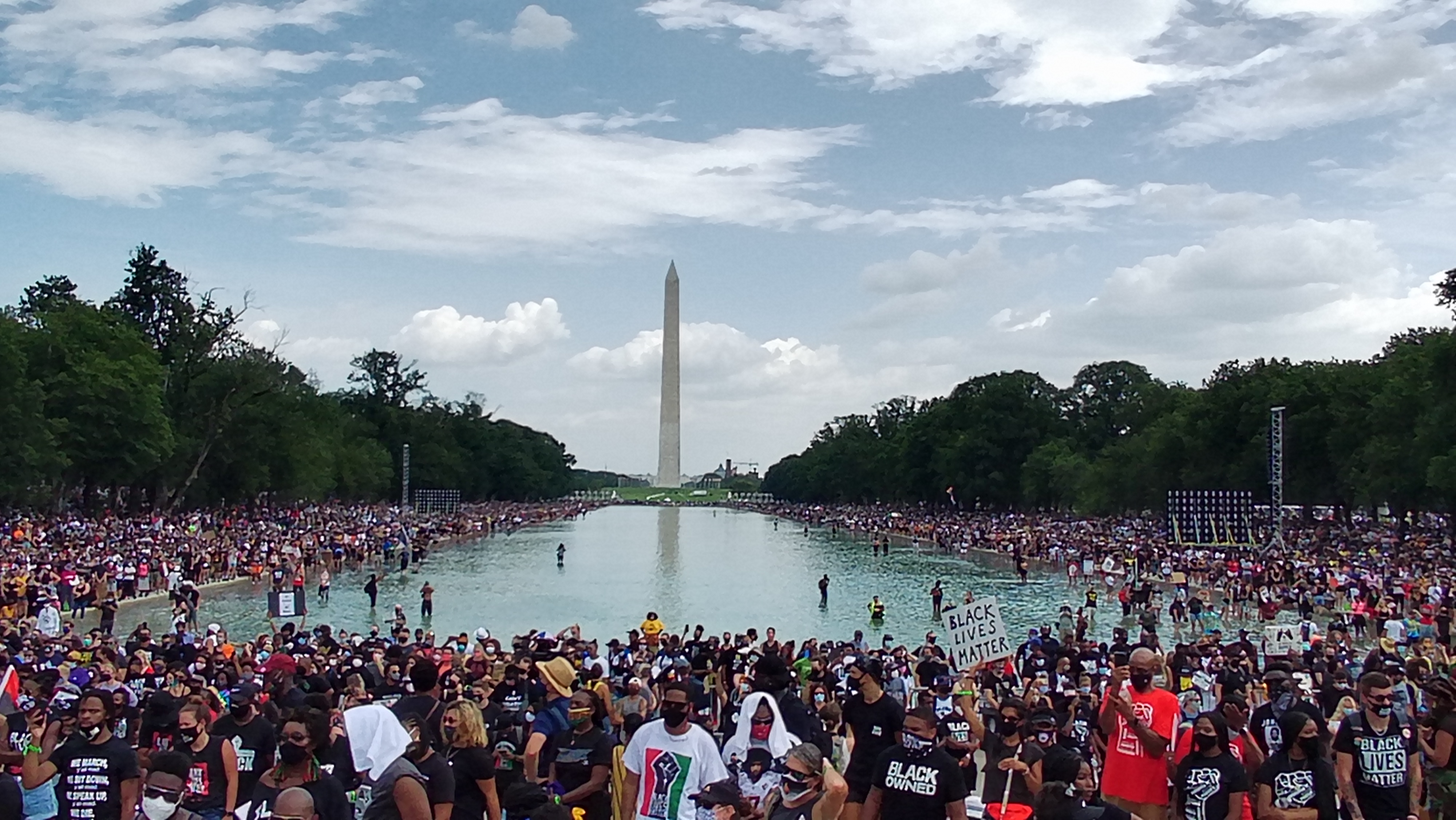
- Date: August 28, 2020
- Location: Washington, D.C., United States
- Type: March
- Organised by: National Action Network
- Participants: Thousands

The Commitment March: Get Your Knee Off Our Necks (also known simply as the Commitment March) was an event held in Washington, D.C., on August 28, 2020. The march was organized by the National Action Network, and was led by Al Sharpton and Martin Luther King III. The march's speakers included relatives of George Floyd, Breonna Taylor, Jacob Blake, among others. Democratic vice-presidential nominee Kamala Harris spoke virtually.

== See also ==
- 2020–2021 United States racial unrest
