= Metropolitan Baptist Church (Philadelphia) =

Baptist church in Philadelphia

- Northminster Presbyterian Church
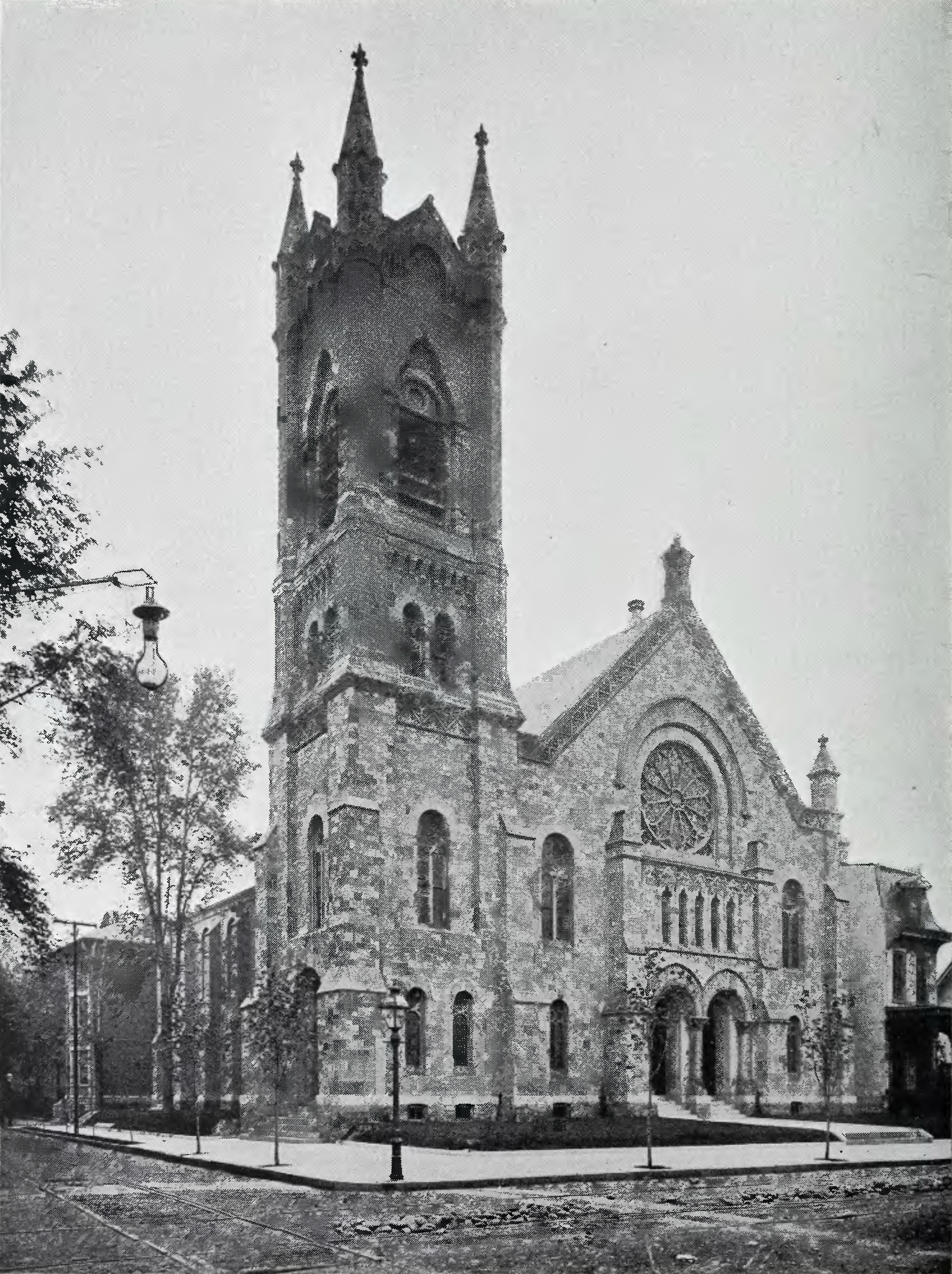
- Photograph of church from 1895 with remnants of original coloring still present

- Location of the church in Pennsylvania
- 39.961177°N 75.192926°W
- Country: United States
- Denomination: Baptist
- Previous denomination: Presbyterian
- Website: www.mbcphila.org

History
- Dedicated: November 11, 1875; 150 years ago

Architecture
- Architect: Thomas Webb Richards
- Architectural type: Gothic revival

Specifications
- Capacity: 800
- Materials: Stone

Clergy
- Pastor: Gregory Johnson

The Metropolitan Baptist Church is a Baptist church located in Powelton Village, Philadelphia, in the United States.

== History ==
For the majority of its history, the church was home to a Presbyterian congregation. The congregation was founded as the First Presbyterian Church of Mantua in 1837. While another building was present, future growth caused a search for a new home, and the plot on 35th and Baring was secured in January 1871. The cornerstone was laid on September 16, 1873. On September 29th, 1875, the name was changed to the Northminster Presbyterian Church. The new building was constructed in 1875, designed by architect Thomas Webb Richards. It was dedicated on November 11 of that year. The roof of the church was finished and reset in 1887. The building was originally covered with Serpentine.

It was later home to the Princeton Presbyterian Church (named after the Princeton Theological Seminary). The Baptist congregation was formed during the Great Depression, and later acquired use of the building in 1955. The Presbyterian congregation moved to Drexel Hill, Pennsylvania.

== List of rectors ==
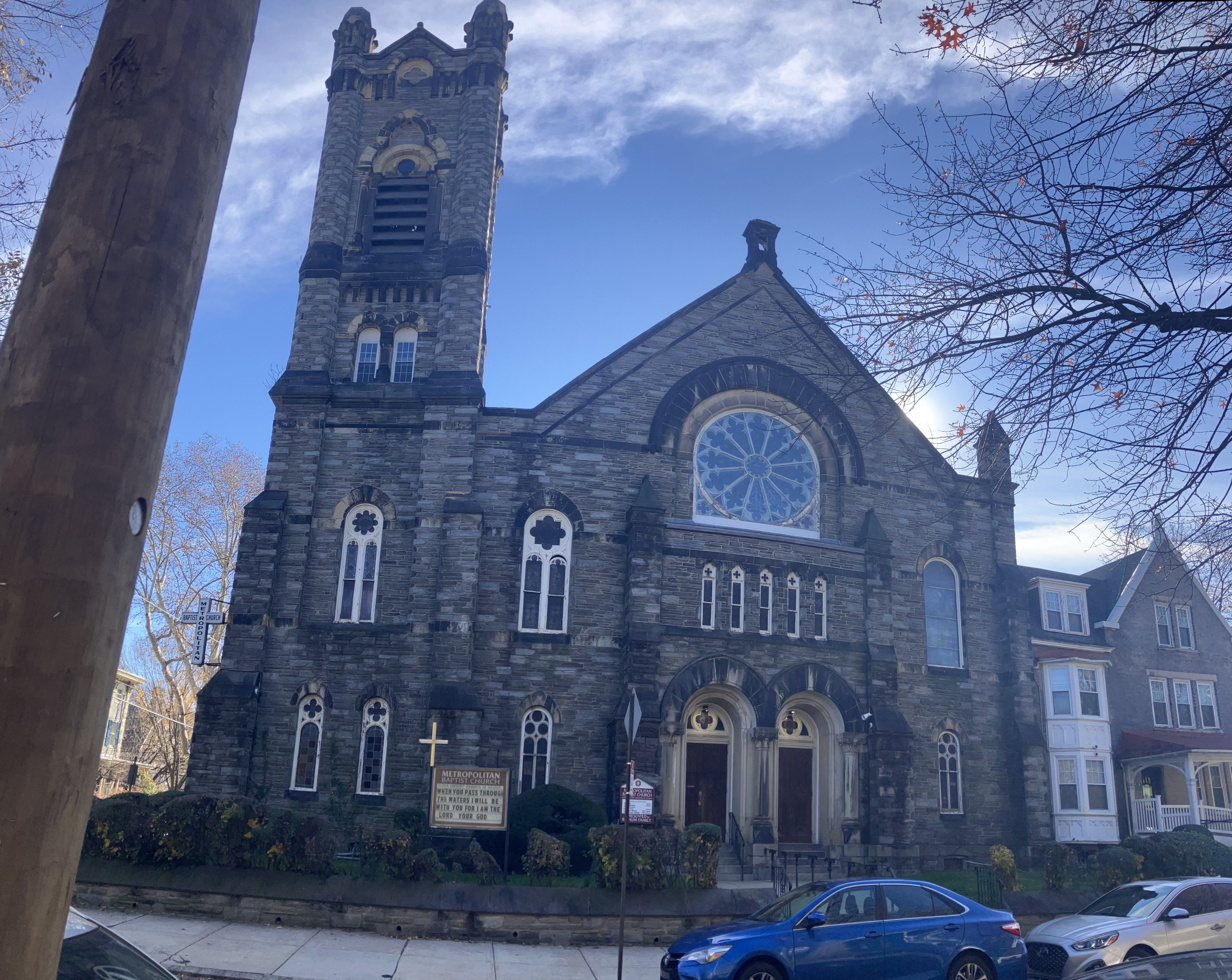
Church in 2025

=== Presbyterian Church ===
==== Pre-move ====
- Pastor Robert S. Drysdale (1846 – 1848)
- Pastor Charles S. Renshaw (May 1849 – April 1853)
- Pastor Thomas S. Johnston (1853 – 1864)
- Pastor H. Augustus Smith (July 1864 – 1882)

==== Post-move ====
- Pastor Robert H. Felton (at least 1883 – 1893)
- Pastor Joseph Wilson Cochran (1895 – 1907)
- Pastor William Courtland Robinson (fl. 1909 – c. November 1914)

=== Baptist church ===
- Pastor Miller Lee Gayton (1953 – 1991)
- Pastor Gregory Johnson (c. 2004 – present)
