= 38th meridian west from Washington =

Archaic line of longitude

The 38th meridian west from Washington is an archaic meridian based on the Washington Meridian, lying approximately 115°02′48″ west of the Prime Meridian through Greenwich. The meridian is not currently used for any boundaries, but historically formed the eastern boundary of Nevada Territory and the state of Nevada and the western boundary of Utah Territory.

== History ==
In 1861, the western portion of what was then Utah Territory was split off to form the Nevada Territory, and the boundary between the two territories was initially set at the 39th meridian west from Washington. However, gold was discovered the next year to the east of this meridian, and Nevada Territory's Congressional delegation requested that the boundary be moved east. Congress granted this request on July 14, 1862, moving the boundary east one degree to the 38th meridian. Nevada Territory became the state of Nevada in 1864, but its eastern boundary would remain at the 38th meridian until May 5, 1866. At that time, in part due to the discovery of more gold, the eastern boundary of Nevada was moved east one degree again to the 37th meridian, where it remains today. Since then, the 38th meridian has not served as a boundary for any U.S. state or territory.
