= German-American Friendship Garden =

Coordinates: 38°53′31″N 77°02′12″W

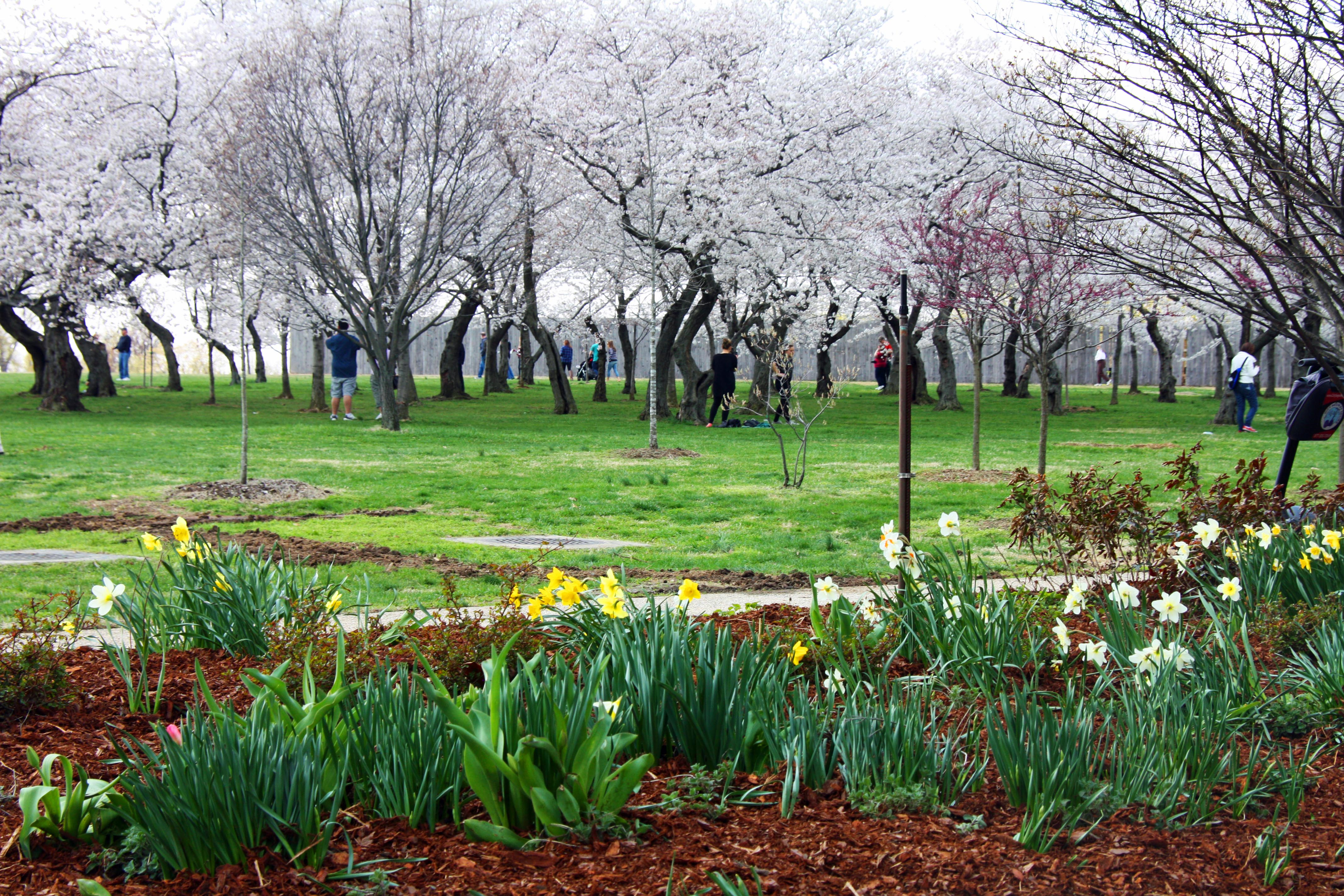
The German-American Friendship Garden in April 2014. Nearby, the cherry blossoms in bloom.

The German-American Friendship Garden on the National Mall in Washington, D.C. is a symbol of the positive and cooperative relations between the United States of America and the Federal Republic of Germany.

Situated within the Washington Monument grounds on the historic axis between the Jefferson Pier and the White House (see White House meridian), the garden borders Constitution Avenue Northwest between 15th and 17th Streets Northwest, where an estimated seven million visitors pass each year. The garden features plants native to both Germany and the United States and provides seating and cooling fountains.

== History ==
Commissioned to commemorate the 300th anniversary of German immigration to America, the garden was dedicated on November 15, 1988.

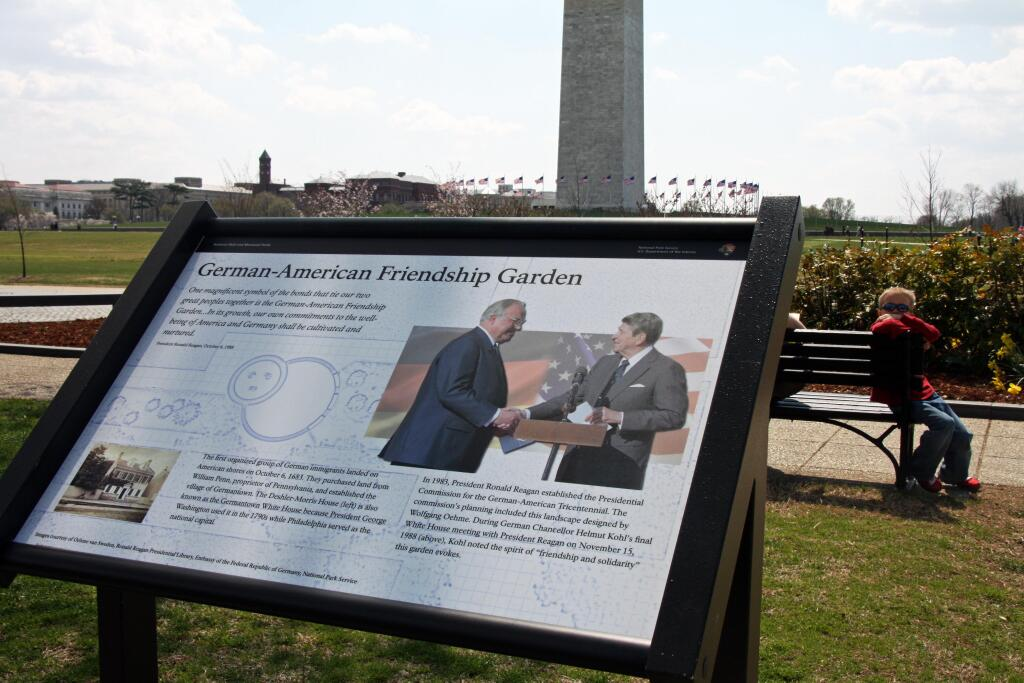
This sign provided by the National Park Service, describes the establishment and history of the German-American Friendship Garden on the National Mall.

As noted by President Ronald Reagan, who created the Presidential Commission to complete work on the project after a 1982 visit to Washington by German Chancellor Helmut Kohl,

... I'm proud to announce a product of that commission: the dedication of a garden here in Washington as a symbol of the friendship between our two countries. In a few months, I'll be leaving the White House, but the garden, and all it represents, will remain, to be nurtured and sustained by the friendship between Germans and Americans ...

The Friendship Garden restoration was launched in 2013 under a joint memorandum signed by the German Embassy, the National Park Service, and the Association of German-American Societies of Greater Washington D.C. The memorandum activated a trust fund whose income is to be used for the upkeep of the Garden. Perennial beds and other native plants and flowers were planted and revitalized. A new irrigation system was installed. The central square panel of the Friendship Garden was also restored and partly redesigned.

The entire project followed the original design of the late German-born landscape artist Wolfgang Oehme, and was carried out under the guidance of the landscaping company Oehme van Sweden.

During a renovation in July, 2026, a vehicle drove over one of the fountains, damaging it.

== See also ==
- Embassy of Germany, Washington, D.C.
- German-American Heritage Foundation of the USA
- German Americans
- List of German Americans
- German in the United States
- German-American Day
- German-Americans in the Civil War
- Auswanderer Denkmal
