= 39th meridian west from Washington =

Archaic line of longitude

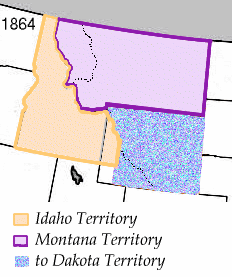
The partition of the Idaho Territory which made the meridian a boundary

The 39th meridian west from Washington is an archaic meridian based on the Washington meridian. The meridian is currently used as a boundary for two states.

The first usage of the meridian as a boundary occurred in 1861, when Nevada Territory was created from the western part of Utah Territory. Initially, the eastern boundary of Nevada Territory was set at this meridian. However, in 1862, that boundary was moved a degree east to follow the 38th meridian, and a few years later was moved still further east to the 37th meridian.

The 39th meridian was used again for a boundary in 1864. In that year, the Montana Territory was created from Idaho Territory with the meridian serving as its extreme northwestern boundary. Montana became a state in 1889, with Idaho following the next year.
