= Nevada Territory =

U.S. Territory (1861–1864)

Coordinates: 39.1642°N 119.7673°W

Territory of Nevada
- Organized incorporated territory of the United States
- 1861–1864
- Flag (1863–1864)

- The Nevada Territory in 1861, with the Utah and New Mexico Territories
- Capital: Genoa (1861); Carson City (1861–1864)
- Government
  - Type: Organized incorporated territory
- Governor
  - 1861 – 1864: James W. Nye
- History
  - Organic act: March 2 1861
  - Statehood: October 31 1864
Preceded by	Succeeded by
Utah Territory	Nevada

The Territory of Nevada (N.T.) was an organized incorporated territory of the United States that existed from March 2, 1861, until October 31, 1864, when it was admitted to the Union as the State of Nevada.

Prior to the creation of the Nevada Territory, the area was part of western Utah Territory and was known as Washoe, after the native Washoe people. The separation of the territory from Utah was important to the federal government because of its political leanings, while the population itself was keen to be separated because of animosity (and sometimes violence) between non-Mormons in Nevada and Mormons from the rest of the Utah Territory.

== History ==
Historical population
Year	Pop.	±%
1860	6,857	—
Source: 1860;

The eastern boundary of Nevada Territory had been defined as the 39th meridian west from Washington, but when gold discoveries were made to the east the Nevada territorial delegation to Congress requested the boundary be moved east to the 38th meridian, which Congress granted in 1862. The border was shifted further east, to the 37th meridian, in 1866, in part due to the discovery of more gold deposits. These eastward shifts took land away from Utah Territory. The southern border of Nevada Territory had been defined as the 37th parallel, but in 1866 Nevada asked Congress to move the border south to the Colorado River. Congress granted the request in 1867, giving Nevada all of the western end of Arizona Territory. Arizona strongly protested, but found little sympathy in Congress due in part to Arizona having aligned with the Confederacy during the Civil War.

The exact location of the due north-south California–Nevada border, between Lake Tahoe and the intersection with the southern boundary of Oregon at the 42nd parallel, was contentious and was surveyed and re-surveyed well into the 20th century.

Congress transferred some of the lands west of the Colorado River including Pah-Ute County, Arizona Territory to the State of Nevada on May 5, 1866. Part of this southern tip of Nevada was established as Clark County in 1909 and contains the city of Las Vegas.

The territorial capital was moved from the provisional capital of Genoa to Carson City. James Warren Nye succeeded Isaac Roop, the first provisional territorial governor, and became the only territorial governor. The secretary of the territory was Orion Clemens (older brother of Samuel Clemens, also known as Mark Twain), who more or less served as governor in Nye's constant absence.

== See also ==
- California Trail
- Great Basin
- Historic regions of the United States
- History of Nevada
- Territorial evolution of the United States
- Mexican Cession, 1848
- State of Deseret, 1849–1850 (extralegal)
