= L'Enfant Plan =

1791 Washington, D.C. urban plan

- Facsimile of 1791 L'Enfant Plan for Washington, D.C.
- U.S. National Register of Historic Places
- U.S. Historic district
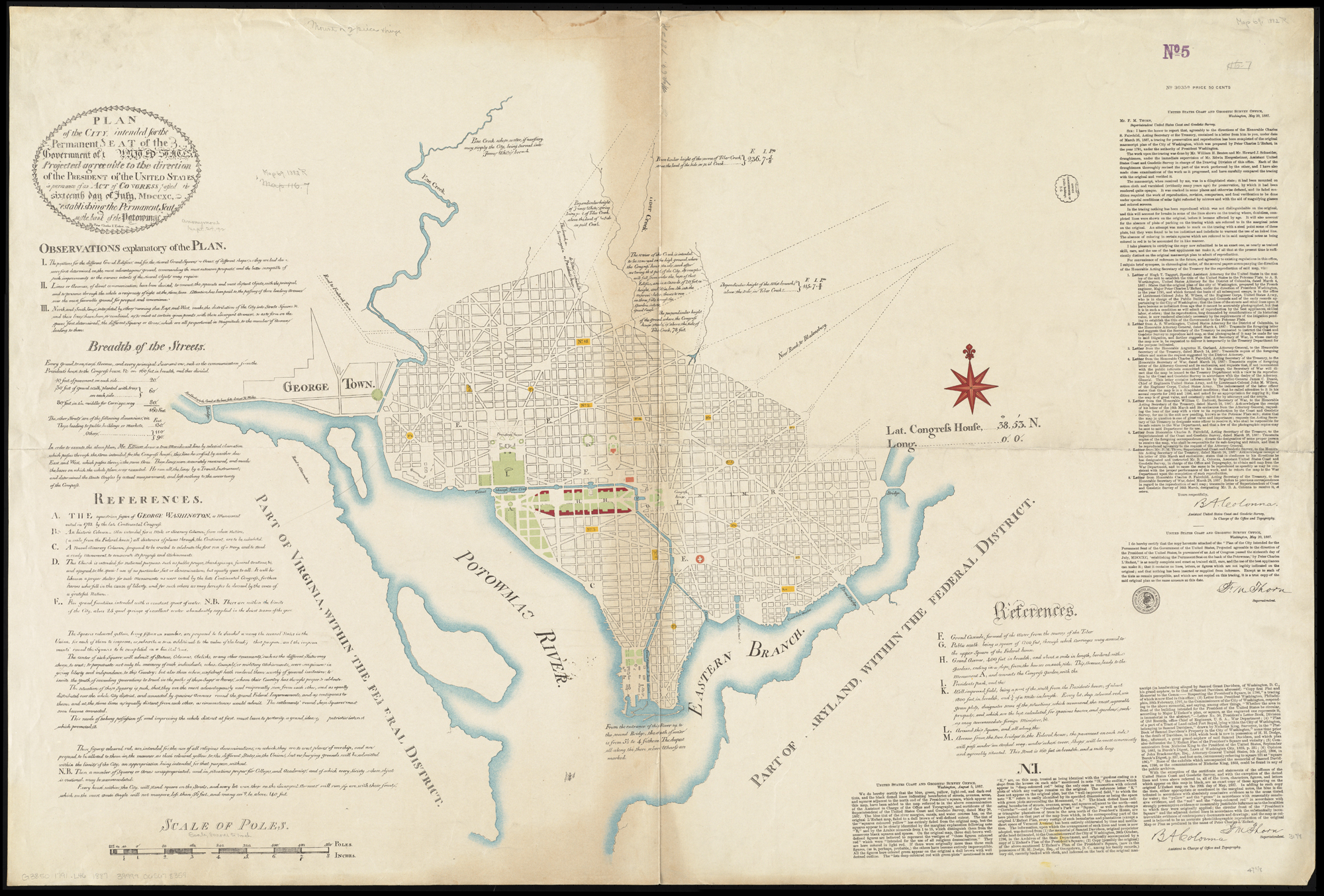
- U.S. Coast and Geodetic Survey facsimile (1887).
- Location: Washington, D.C.
- Coordinates: 38°53′26″N 77°1′13″W
- Built: 1791
- Architect: Pierre Charles L'Enfant
- Architectural style: Baroque urban planning
- NRHP reference No.: 97000332
- Added to NRHP: April 24, 1997

The L'Enfant Plan is an urban plan for Washington, D.C. designed by French artist and engineer Pierre Charles L'Enfant in 1791. It is regarded as a landmark in urban design and has inspired plans for other world capitals such as Brasília, New Delhi, and Canberra. In the United States, plans for Detroit, Indianapolis, and Sacramento took inspiration from the plan.

== History ==
View of the City of Washington in 1792

L'Enfant was a French artist and engineer who served in the Continental Army during the American Revolutionary War. In 1789, discussions were underway regarding a new federal capital city for the United States, and L'Enfant wrote to President Washington asking to be commissioned to plan the city. However, any decision on the capital was put on hold until July 1790 when Congress passed the Residence Act. The legislation specified that the new capital should be situated on the Potomac River, at some location between the Eastern Branch (the Anacostia River) and the Conococheague Creek near Hagerstown, Maryland. The Residence Act gave authority to President Washington to appoint three commissioners to oversee the survey of the federal district and provide public buildings to accommodate the Federal government in 1800.

In 1791, Washington appointed L'Enfant to plan the new federal city, under the supervision of three commissioners whom Washington had earlier appointed to oversee the planning and development of the territory that became the District of Columbia. Included in the new district were the riverport towns of Georgetown (formerly in Montgomery County, Maryland) and Alexandria, Virginia.

Thomas Jefferson, who was serving as Washington's secretary of state, worked with Washington in the overall planning of the nation's capital. Jefferson sent L'Enfant a letter outlining his task, which was to provide a drawing of suitable sites for the federal city and the public buildings. Jefferson had modest ideas for the capital. However, L'Enfant saw the task as far more grandiose, believing that he was also devising the city plan and designing the buildings.

L'Enfant arrived in Georgetown on March 9, 1791, and began his work from Suter's Fountain Inn. Washington arrived on March 28 to meet with L'Enfant and the commissioners for several days. L'Enfant was also provided a roll of maps by Jefferson depicting Frankfurt, Amsterdam, Strasbourg, Paris, Orléans, Bordeaux, Lyon, Marseille, Turin, and Milan. (A common misconception is that of these, L'Enfant was chiefly inspired by the grand boulevards and urban fabric of Paris. In reality, the Haussman Plan, which created the version of the city that is known today, was not enacted until 1853.) On June 22, L'Enfant presented his first plan for the federal city to the president. On August 19, he appended a new map to a letter that he sent to the president. Washington retained a copy of one of L'Enfant's plans, showed it to the Congress, and later gave it to the three commissioners. In November 1791, L'Enfant secured the lease of quarries at Wigginton Island and southeast along Aquia Creek to supply well-regarded Aquia Creek sandstone for the foundation of the Congress House.

== The Plan ==
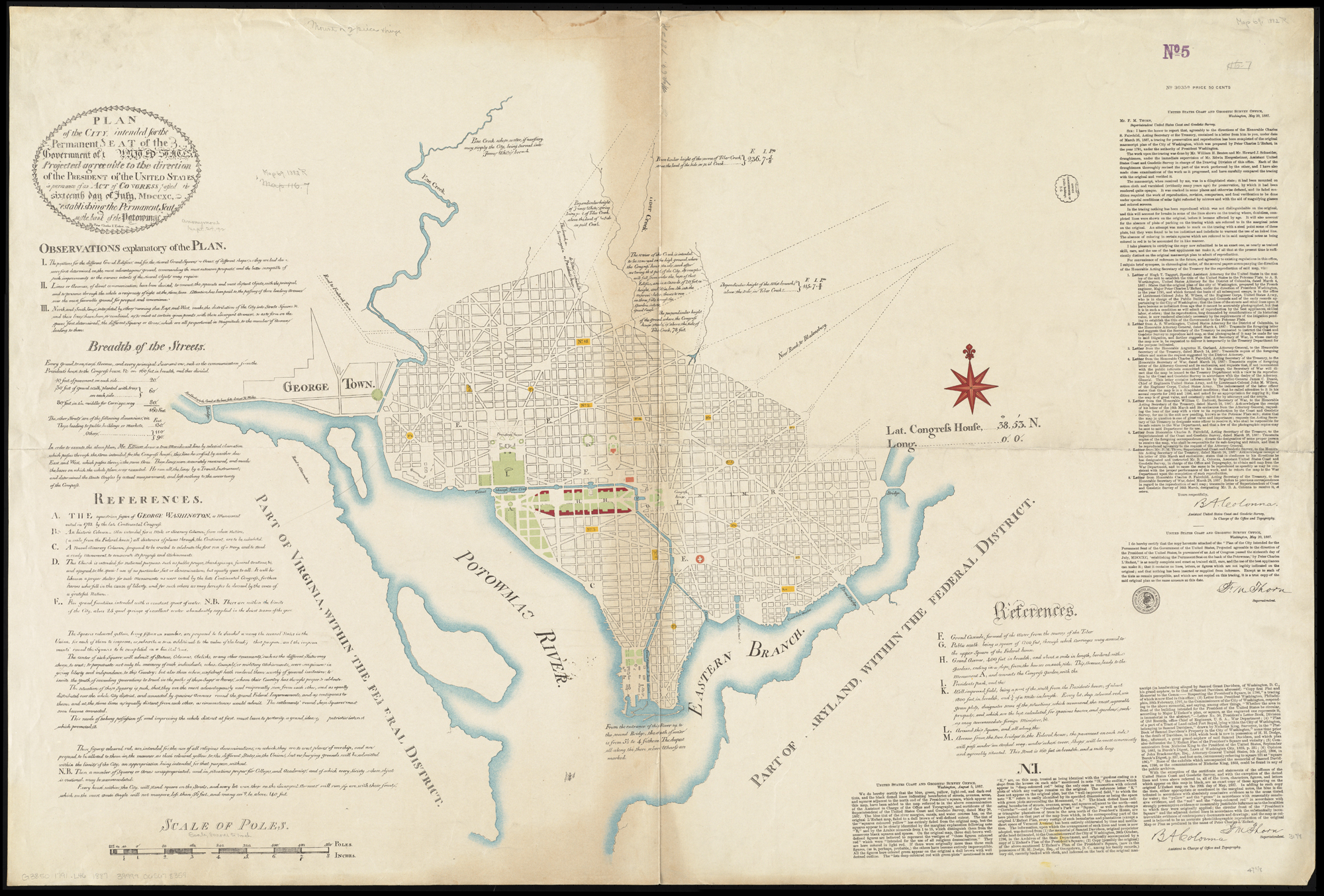
^{Boston Public Library} Facsimile of manuscript of Peter Charles L'Enfant's 1791 plan for the federal capital city (U.S. Coast and Geodetic Survey, 1887).

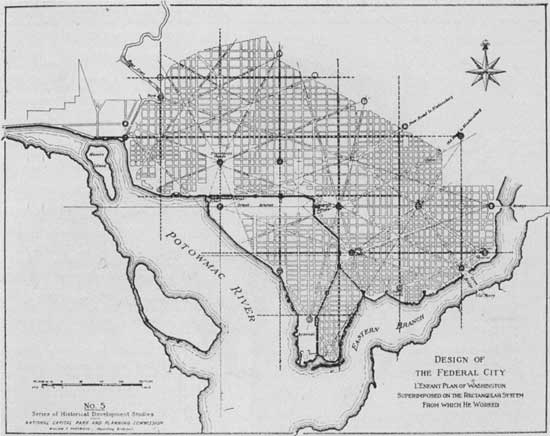
Design of the Federal City: L'Enfant Plan of Washington Superimposed on the Rectangular System From which He Worked (1930)

L'Enfant's "plan of the city intended for the permanent seat of the government of the United States..." encompassed an area bounded by the Potomac River, the Eastern Branch, the base of the escarpment of the Atlantic Seaboard Fall Line, and Rock Creek (named on the plan as Pine Creek). His plan specified locations for two buildings, the "Congress House" (the United States Capitol) and the "President's House" (known after its 1815–1817 rebuilding and repainting of its stone walls, as the White House or Executive Mansion).

The plan specified that most streets would be laid out in a grid. To form the grid, some streets (later named for letters of the alphabet) would travel in an east–west direction, while others (named for numbers) would travel in a north–south direction. Broader diagonal grand avenues, later named after the states of the Union, crossed the north–south/east–west grid. These "grand avenues" intersected with the north–south and east–west streets at circles and rectangular plazas that would later honor notable Americans and provide open space.

L'Enfant's plan additionally laid out a system of canals (later designated as the Washington City Canal) that would pass the Congress House and the President's House. One branch of the canal would empty into the Potomac River south of the President's House at the mouth of Tiber Creek, which would be channelized and straightened. The other branch of the canal would channelize James Creek and would divide and empty into the Eastern Branch at two separate points near the Eastern Branch's confluence with the Potomac River. The scale and complexity of the canals in the 1791-92 plan and its revisions suggested the importance of the canals within the grand design of the city, with important structures located along its banks—the proposed National Pantheon, Judiciary Square, a market/exchange complex, a national bank and theater, as well as a grand church complex.

=== "Congress House" ===
The Congress House (known as the United States Capitol) would be built on Jenkins Hill (later to be known as Capitol Hill), which L'Enfant described as a "pedestal awaiting a monument". Emphasizing the importance of the new nation's legislature, the Congress House would be located on a longitude designated as 0:0.

=== "President's House" ===
The President's House would be situated on a ridge parallel to the Potomac River north of the mouth of Tiber Creek, which L'Enfant proposed to canalize. L'Enfant envisioned the President's House to have public gardens and monumental architecture. Reflecting his grandiose visions, he specified that the President's House (occasionally referred to as the President's Palace) would be five times the size of the building that was actually constructed, even then becoming the largest residence then constructed in America.

=== National Mall ===
A prominent geometric feature of L'Enfant's plan was a large right triangle whose hypotenuse was a wide avenue (now part of Pennsylvania Avenue, NW) connecting the President's House and the Congress House. To complete the triangle, a line projecting due south from the center of the President's House intersected at a right angle a line projecting due west from the center of the Congress House. A 400-foot-wide (122 m) garden-lined grand avenue containing a public walk (which became the National Mall) would travel for about 1 mile (1.6 km) along the east–west line.

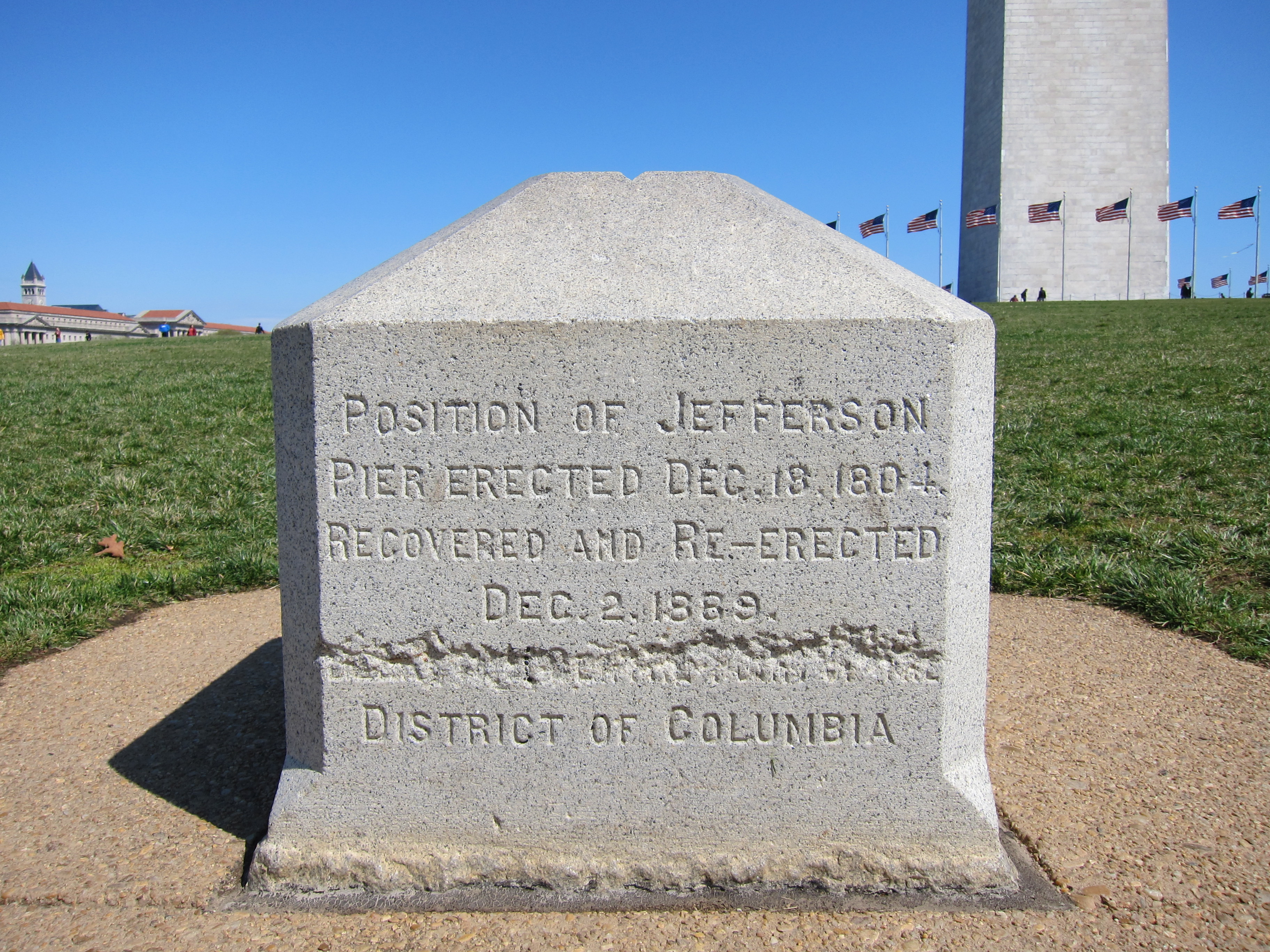
West side of Jefferson Pier, with Washington Monument in background (2012)

In 1793, a wooden marker was placed at the triangle's southwest corner (the intersection of the cross axis of the White House and the Capitol). A small stone obelisk, the Jefferson Pier, replaced the marker in 1804.

=== Squares and public spaces ===
The 15 states at the time were each allocated a square to build on and decorate as they saw fit. They would be located along the avenues and were to be easily visible from each other to engender friendly competition. The plan identified some of the circles and rectangular plazas as numbered reservations. The plan's legends identified uses for other open spaces that letters in the alphabet identified. Other legends specified the widths of grand avenues and streets.

== Plan References ==
Along the margins of the plan and map was a key of references that L'Enfant authored. They are listed as follows:

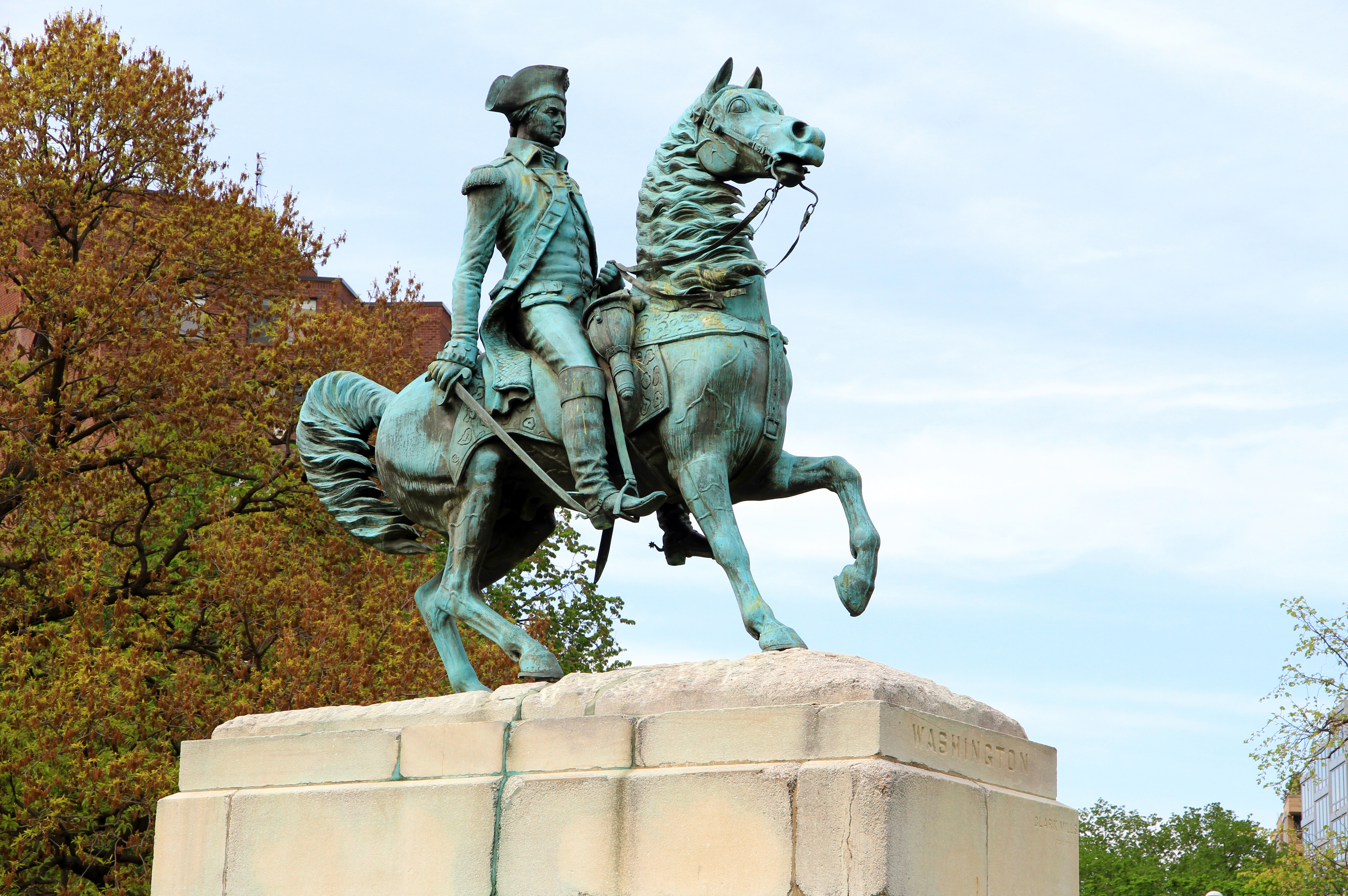
Reference A: An equestrian statue of George Washington (depicted here in Washington Circle) was intended for the site of the Washington Monument

=== Reference A ===
"THE equestrian figure of George Washington, a monument voted in by the late Continental Congress."

=== Reference B ===
“An historic column – also intended for a mile or itinerary column, from whose station, (a mile from the Federal house) all distances of places through the Continent, are to be calculated” (now the site of Lincoln Park)

=== Reference C ===
"A Naval itinerary Column, proposed to be erected to celebrate the first prize of a Navy and to stand a ready Monument to consecrate its progress and achievements. . . ."

=== Reference D ===
"The Church is intended for national purposes such as public prayer, Thanksgiving, funeral orations, and assigned to no special sect or denomination, but equally open to all. It will be likewise a proper shelter as were voted by the late Continental Congress, for those heroes that fell in the cause of liberty, as for such others as may hereafter by decreed by the voice of a grateful nation." (Now the site of the National Portrait Gallery)

=== Reference E ===
"Five grand fountains intended with a constant spout of water. N. B. There are within the limits of the City above 25 good springs of excellent water abundantly supplied in the driest season of the year."

=== Reference F ===
"Grand Cascade, formed of water from the sources of the Tiber."

=== Reference G ===
"Public walk, being a square of 1200 feet, through which carriages may ascend to the upper Square of the Federal House."

=== Reference H ===
"Grand Avenue was planned to be 400 feet (120 m) wide and approximately one mile (1.6 km) long. It was to be bordered by gardens, terminate at a slope between houses on either side, and lead to Monument A....

=== Reference I ===
President’s park and the...

=== Reference K ===
Well improved field being part of the public walk from the President’s house, of about 1800 feet in breadth, and ¾ a mile in length. Every lot deep colored red with green plots, designates some of the situations, which indicate premium sites, and which are the best calculated for houses and gardens, such as may accommodate foreign ministers.

=== Reference L ===
Around this square, and all along the avenue

=== Reference M ===
Around the square [to the east] of the Capitol [and] along the Avenue from the two bridges to the Federal house, the pavement on each side will pass under an arched way, under whose cover Shops will be most conveniently and agreeably situated. This street is 160 feet in breadth and a mile long."

=== Additional References ===
"The squares colored yellow, being fifteen in number, are proposed to be divided among the several states, in the Union for each of them to improve or subscribe in additional value to the land that purpose and improvements round the Squares are to be completed in a limited time."

"The center of each Square will admit of Statues, Columns, Obelisks, or any other ornament such as the different States may choose to erect: to perpetuate not only the memory of such individuals whose counsels or Military achievements were conspicuous in giving liberty and independence to this Country; but also those whose usefulness hath rendered them worthy of general imitation, to invite the youth of succeeding generations to tread in the paths of those sages, or heroes whom their country has thought proper to celebrate."

"The situation of these Squares is such that they are the most advantageously and reciprocally seen from each other and as equally distributed over the whole City district, and connected by spacious avenues round the grand Federal Improvements and as contiguous to them, and at the same time as equally distant from each other, as circumstances would admit. The Settlements round those Squares must soon become connected.”

== Andrew Ellicott's revisions to the plan ==
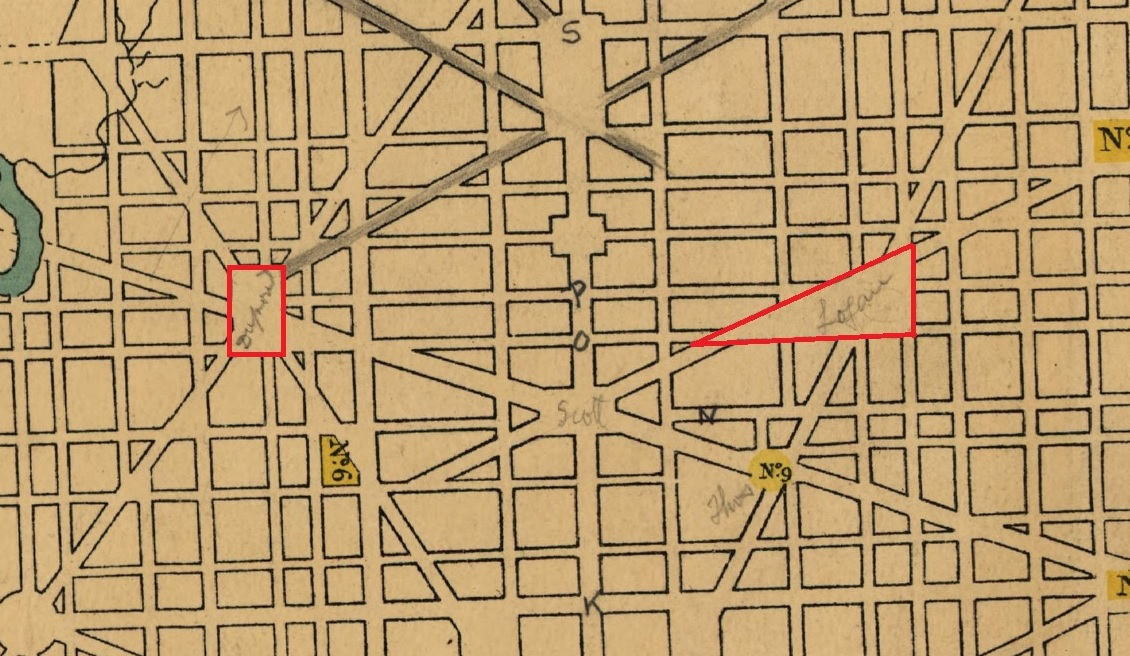
^{Library of Congress} L'Enfant's original design for Dupont and Logan Circles (outlined in red) featured rectangular and triangular shapes respectively. Both were later modified to a circular shape by Ellicott.

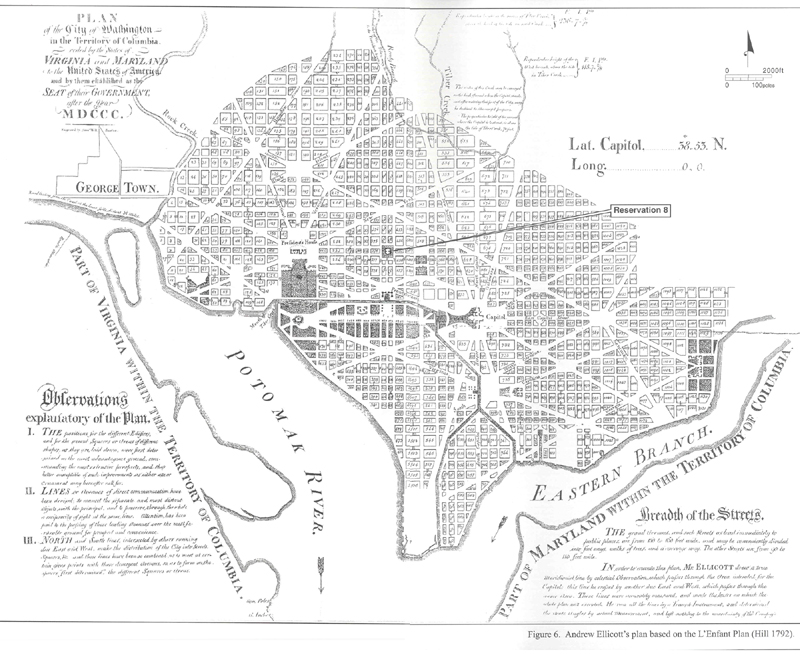
Ellicott's Plan of the City of Washington in the Territory of Columbia, engraved by Samuel Hill, Boston, 1792, showing street names, lot numbers, the coordinates of the Capitol and legends

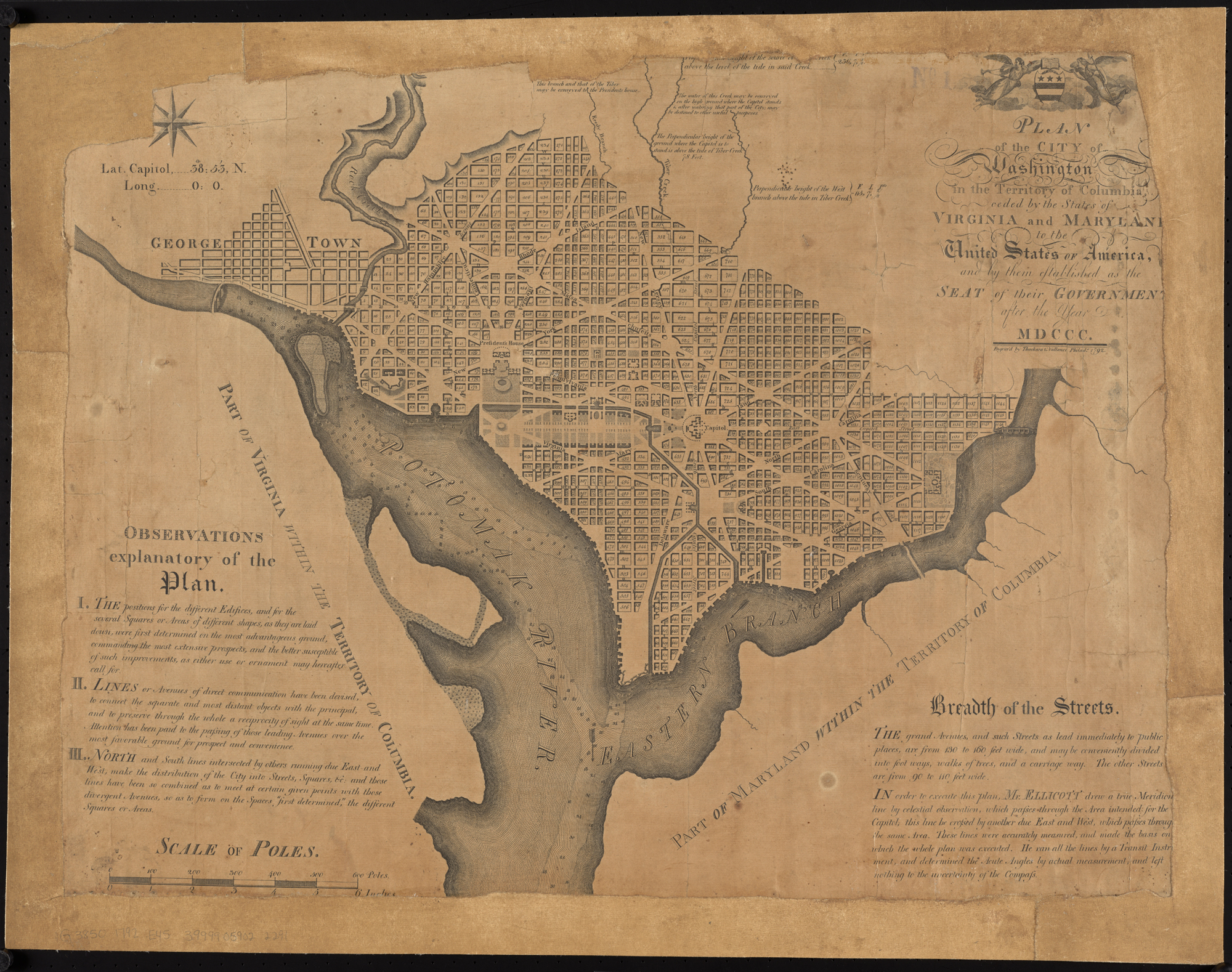
^{Boston Public Library} Ellicott's Plan of the City of Washington in the Territory of Columbia engraved by Thackera & Vallance, Philadelphia, 1792, showing the names of L'Enfant's "grand avenues" and East Capitol Street, the coordinates of the Capitol, the depths of the channels of the Potomac River and the Eastern Branch, lot numbers and legends

Under the direction of the commissioners, Andrew Ellicott had in 1791 been conducting the first survey of the boundaries of the federal district (the "Territory of Columbia") as well as assisting L'Enfant in the planning and survey of the smaller federal city (the "City of Washington"). In February 1792, Ellicott informed the commissioners that L'Enfant had not been able to have the city plan engraved and had refused to provide him with an original version of the plan for the city. Ellicott and his brother Benjamin then revised the plan, despite L'Enfant's protests.

Ellicott's revisions changed the city's planned layout. His changes included the straightening of a grand avenue (Massachusetts Avenue), the removal of L'Enfant's Square No. 15 and several other open spaces, as well as the conversions of some circles and arcs to rectangles and straight lines (one of which straightened an arc on the southern side of the present Judiciary Square). His revisions also identified L'Enfant's Congress House as the Capitol.

After President Washington dismissed L'Enfant, Andrew Ellicott and his assistants continued the city survey in accordance with the revised plan, several versions of which were engraved, published, and distributed in Philadelphia and Boston. As a result, Ellicott's revision subsequently became the basis for the capital city's development.

Ellicott's most complete plan, engraved and printed in 1792 by Thackera and Valance in Philadelphia, contained the names of L'Enfant's grand avenues and East Capitol Street as well as lot numbers and the depths of the channels of the "Potomak" River and the Eastern Branch. This and other plans that Ellicott designed lacked both L'Enfant's name and the numerical designations for the reservations that L'Enfant had placed in the plan. The legends in each conveyed less information that did those in L'Enfant's plan.

== Manuscripts and copies of the plan ==
In a paper published in 1899, John Stewart, a civil engineer who was in charge of records in the United States Army Engineers' Office of Public Buildings and Grounds, wrote that President Washington had sent one of L'Enfant's handwritten plans to Congress on December 13, 1791. Stewart wrote that L'Enfant had sent this plan to the president on August 19, 1791, and had also prepared a larger exact copy. Stewart stated that surveyors had used the copy to lay out the city's streets and that L'Enfant had employed a Philadelphia architect to draft a copy of the larger version for L'Enfant's own use.

Stewart also wrote that President Washington had in December 1796 sent to the commissioners a plan of the city that had contained penciled directions from Thomas Jefferson that identified those parts of the plan that the plan's engravers should omit. Stewart stated that he had discovered that plan in the commissioners' office in 1873. He reported that the plan was still in that office in 1898.

During 1882, Stewart had been in charge of records that the Office of the United States Commissioner of Public Buildings was holding. In that year, he created a black and white copy of several portions of a manuscript plan of the federal capital city. The last line in an oval in the upper left corner of Stewart's reproduction contains the words "Peter Charles L'Enfant", which are written in a typeface and alignment that are similar to those in the line that precedes it. Stewart certified that "this is a true copy of the original in this office".

Five years later, in 1887, the United States Coast and Geodetic Survey prepared a colored tracing of a manuscript plan. The last line in the oval contained the words "By Peter Charles L'Enfant", which were written in a serif typeface. The typeface and its alignment differed from those in the oval's preceding line.

Printers published the tracing in at least four formats, which together enabled the plan to be widely distributed for the first time. The printers added to each of the reproduced tracings a copy of a message that a survey assistant had sent to the survey's superintendent. The message stated that the acting secretary of the treasury had directed that the tracing be produced for the purposes of preservation and reproduction. The message further stated that the plan's original manuscript was in a dilapidated state and had earlier been mounted on cotton cloth and varnished for preservation, rendering the manuscript "quite opaque".

The survey assistant's message additionally contained a synopsis of letters requesting the tracing that a special assistant attorney for the United States, the United States attorney for the District of Columbia, the United States attorney general, the acting secretary of the treasury and the United States secretary of war had written. The assistant attorney's letter stated that pending litigation (see Morris v. United States [the "Potomac Flats" case]) had necessitated the plan's reproduction to enable the United States government to establish title of the Government to the Potomac Flats.

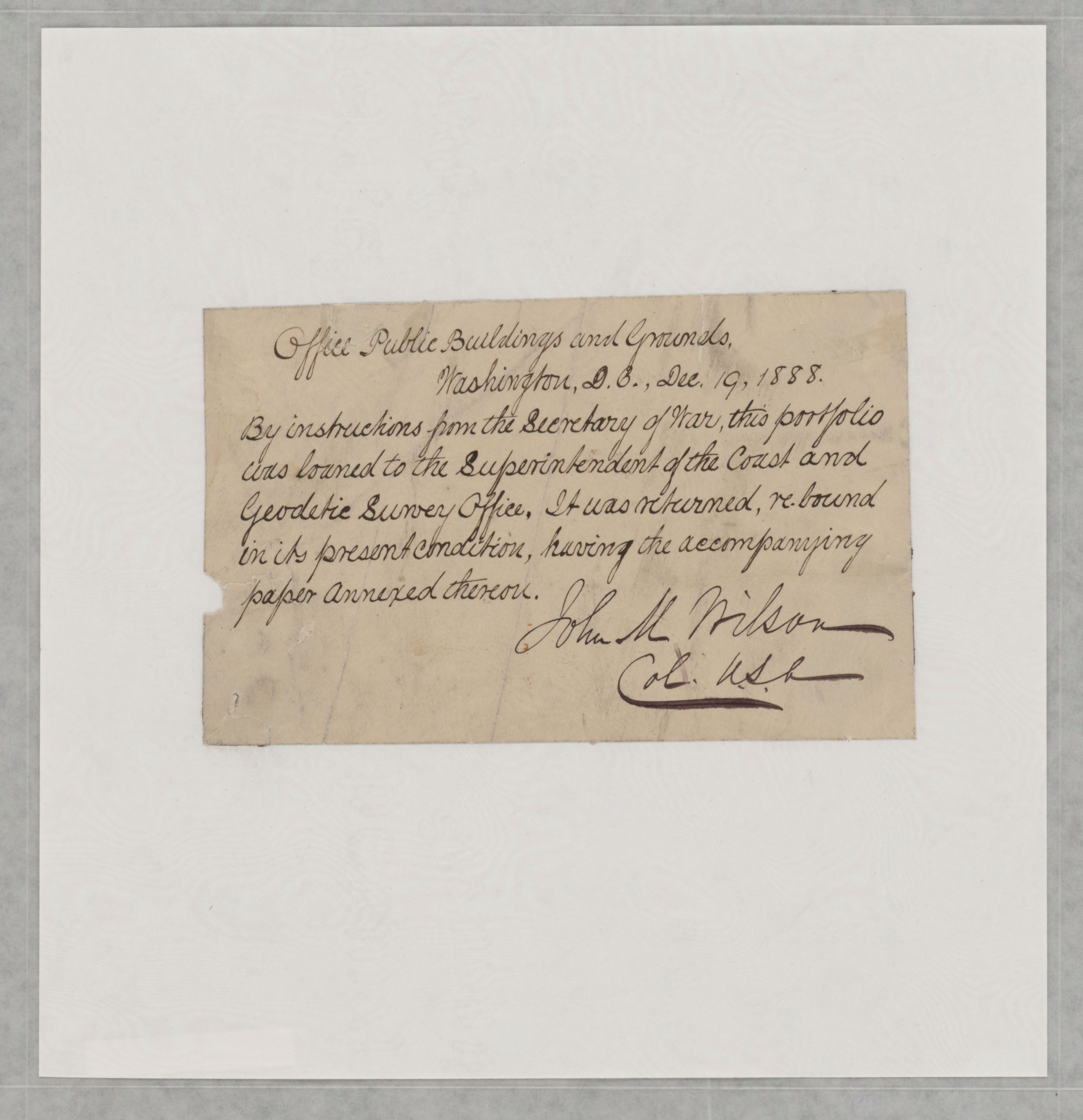
^{National Archives and Records Administration} Letter documenting the return of the L'Enfant Plan to the Office of Buildings and Grounds, December 19, 1888

The assistant attorney's letter further stated that an office of the Corps of Engineers that was in charge of public buildings and grounds was holding the original plan, which had become so indistinct that it could not be accurately photographed. Several of the letter writers asked the Coast and Geodetic Survey to return the original manuscript plan to the War Department after the Survey had reproduced it, whereupon it was returned to the Corps' Office of Buildings and Grounds.

In 1930, the chief of the Division of Maps at the Library of Congress compared the wording in one of reproduced tracings to the wording in an annex to a plan of the City of Washington which, according to a January 1792 publication, President Washington had recently sent to Congress and which contained the words "By Peter Charles L'Enfant". The librarian concluded that the two maps were not the same.

A Library of Congress web page states that, on November 11, 1918, a map that L'Enfant had prepared was presented to the Library of Congress for safekeeping. In a 1930 report to the National Capital Park and Planning Commission, William Partridge described the features and history of that map, as well as the changes that Andrew Ellicott had apparently made to the map.

Partridge noted that L'Enfant had written that all of his drawings had been seized in December 1791, but that only one, a plan for the city of Washington, had been recovered. He further stated that although L'Enfant had produced a number of versions of his plan, only one (an intermediate version) was still known to exist. Partridge concluded that the origin of that plan, which the Library of Congress was holding, was still in doubt. That plan, which the Library now holds in its Geography and Map Division, is still the only map of the capital city bearing L'Enfant's name that is widely known.

The library's web page states that, in 1991, to commemorate the two hundredth anniversary of the manuscript map, the Library of Congress, in cooperation with the National Geographic Society, the National Park Service and the United States Geological Survey, published an exact-size, full-color facsimile and an uncolored computer-assisted reproduction of that map. The manuscript's upper left corner contains an oval that identifies the title of the map, followed by the words "By Peter Charles L'Enfant" written in a serif typeface that has the same alignment as does that in the United States Coast and Geodetic Survey's 1887 tracing.

The library states that these reproductions were the library's first facsimiles to be based on photography and electronic enhancement technology. The library further states that, during the reproduction process, it was possible to record faint editorial annotations that Thomas Jefferson had made and which are now virtually illegible on the original map. Some of the differences between L'Enfant's and Ellicott's plans, including the name of the Capitol and the absence in Ellicott's plan of L'Enfant's name and some of his plan's legends, reflect the instructions contained in Jefferson's annotations.

The library states (as did Partridge) that it is believed that its Plan is one that L'Enfant submitted to President Washington in August 1791. However, others have contended that the named manuscript map that the library holds is actually an earlier draft that was hand-delivered to George Washington in June 1791.

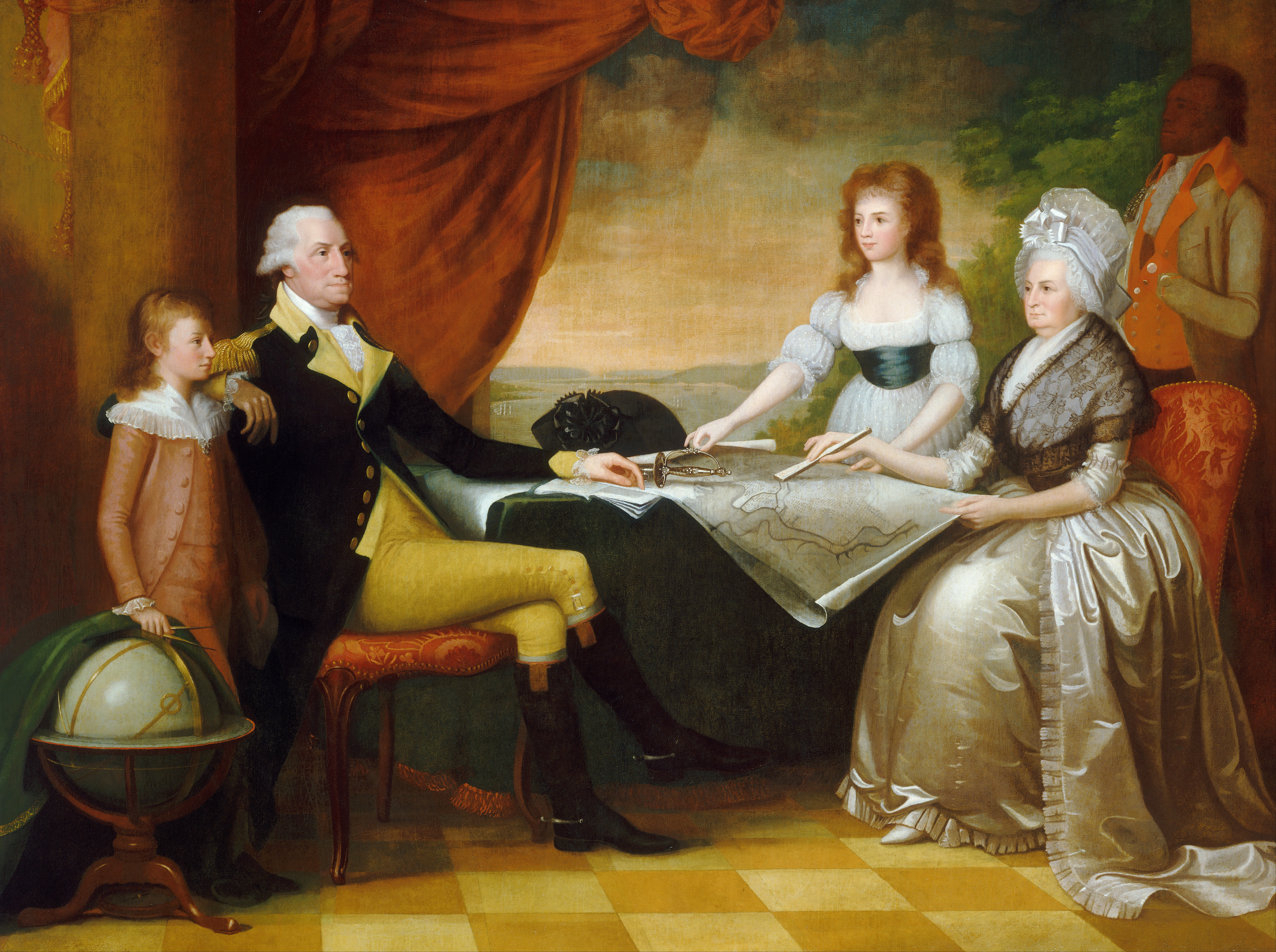
The Washington Family, depicts L'Enfant's Plan

The library has in its collections a "Dotted line map of Washington, D.C., 1791" that lacks an author's name. The library's notes state that this document is a "Ms. survey map drawn by P.C. L'Enfant" and is "accompanied by positive and negative photocopies of L'Enfant's letter to George Washington, Aug. 19, 1791, the original in the L'Enfant papers". (L'Enfant's papers include an August 19, 1791, letter to President Washington that contains an "annexed map of dotted lines".) The named plan would therefore be the one that L'Enfant annexed to his June 22, 1791 letter to the president. Comparisons of Andrew Ellicott's February 1792 revision of L'Enfant's Plan with the two manuscript maps suggest that Ellicott had based his revision (which printers distributed soon after its preparation) on the August 1791 "dotted line map", rather than on the June 1791 manuscript.

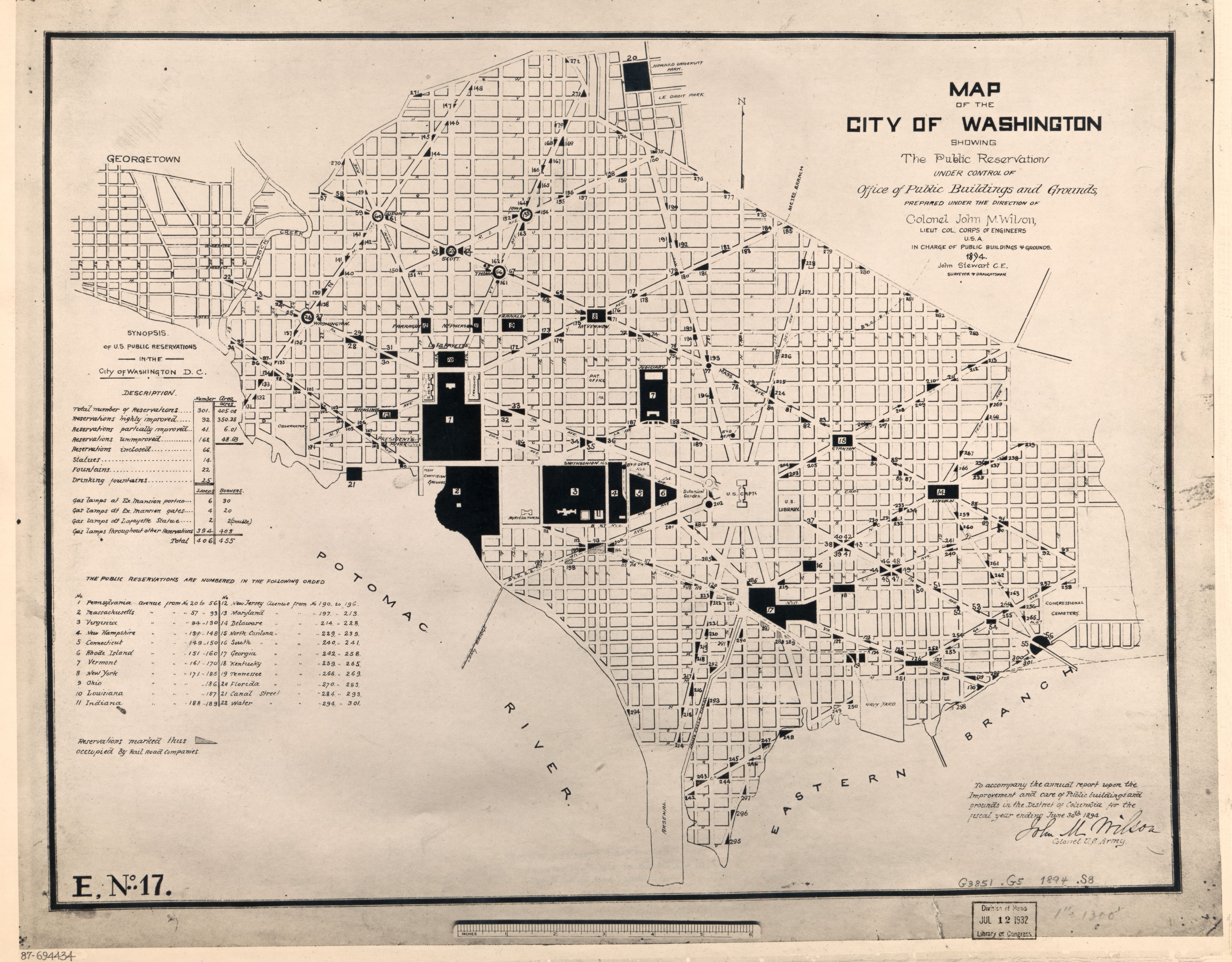
Public Reservations, 1894

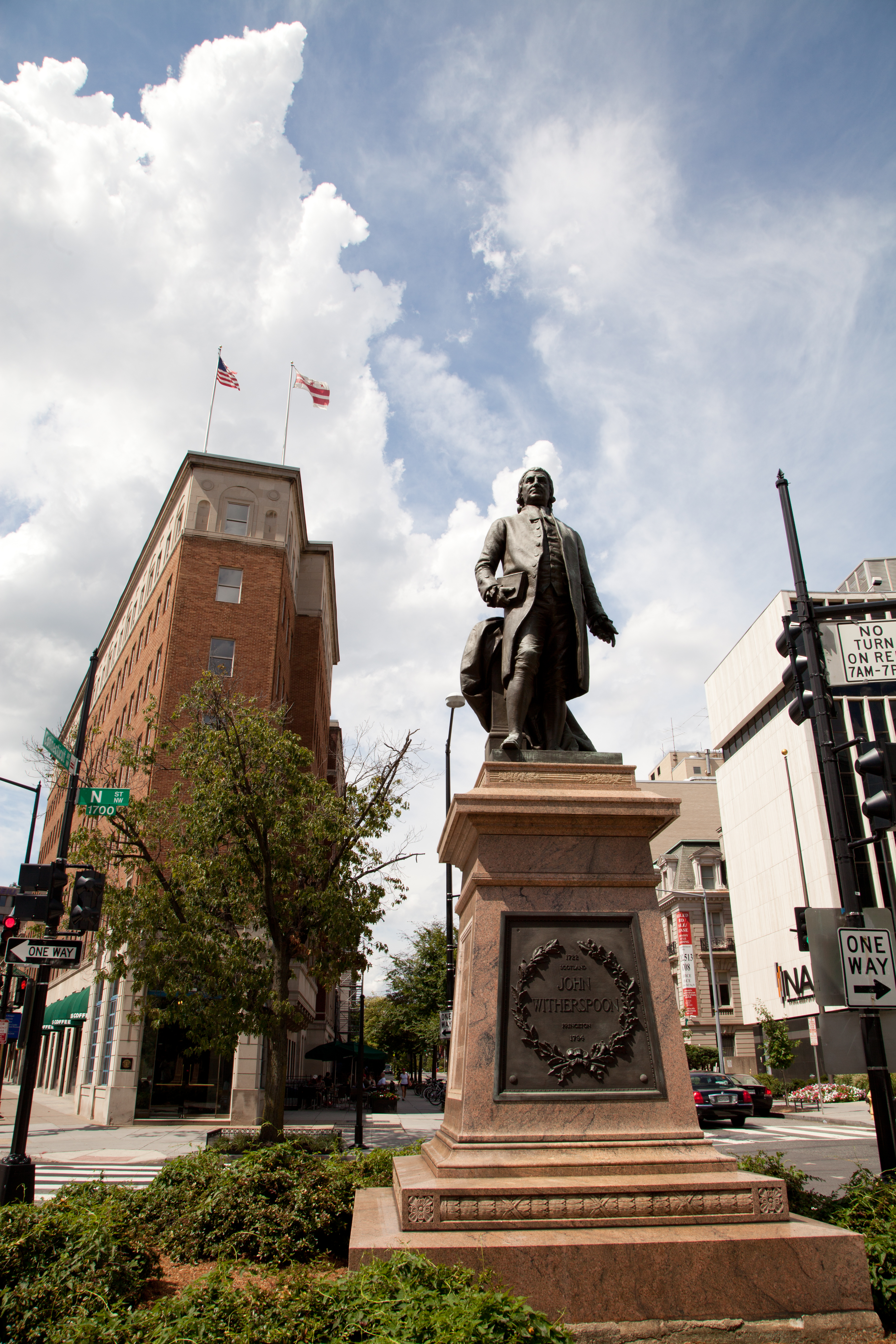
Witherspoon Park at 18th and N Street, NW, is an example of a triangular park

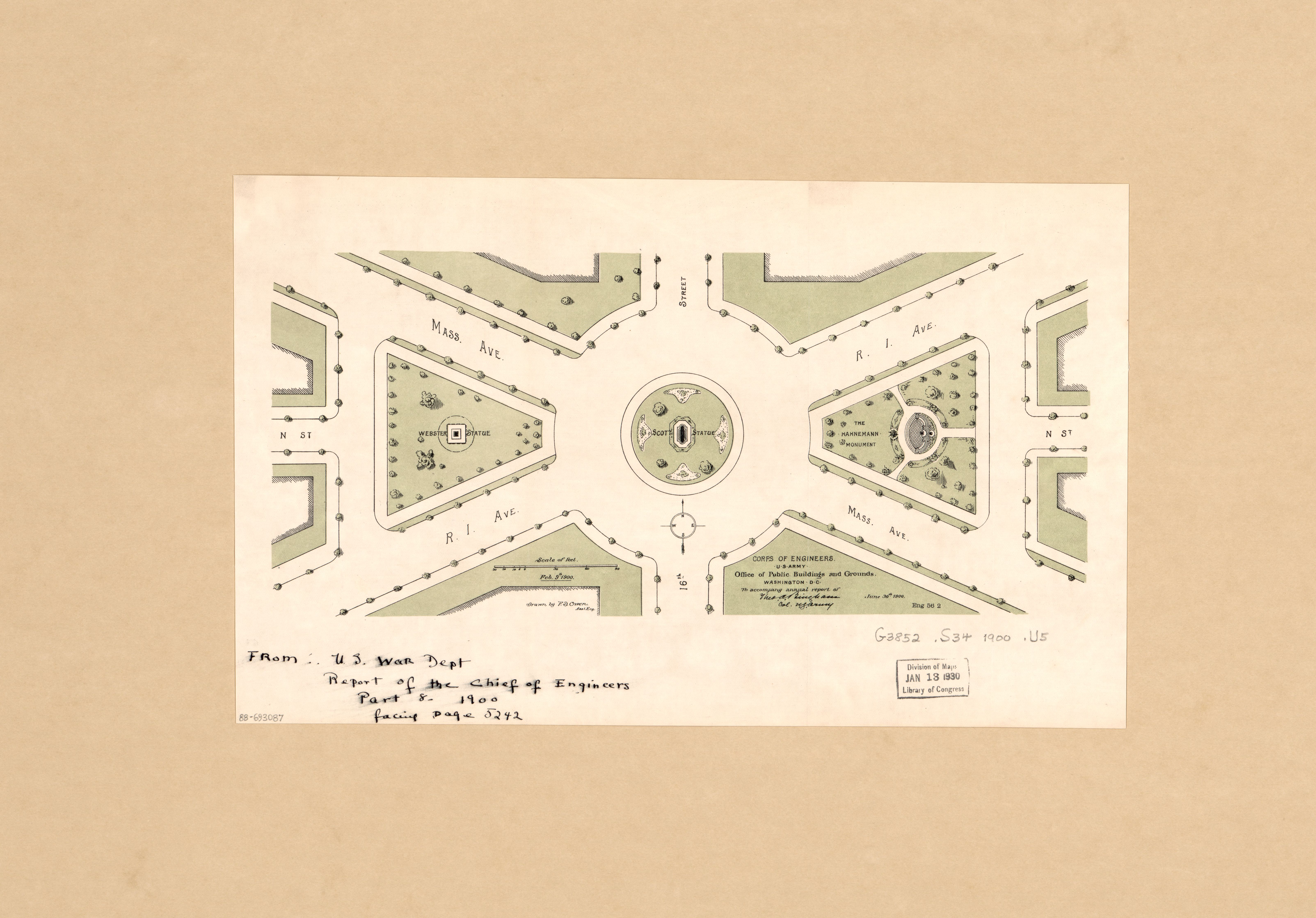
Scott Circle in the full bow-tie shape within the rectangle accompanied a 1900 Report of the Chief of Engineers, U.S. Army

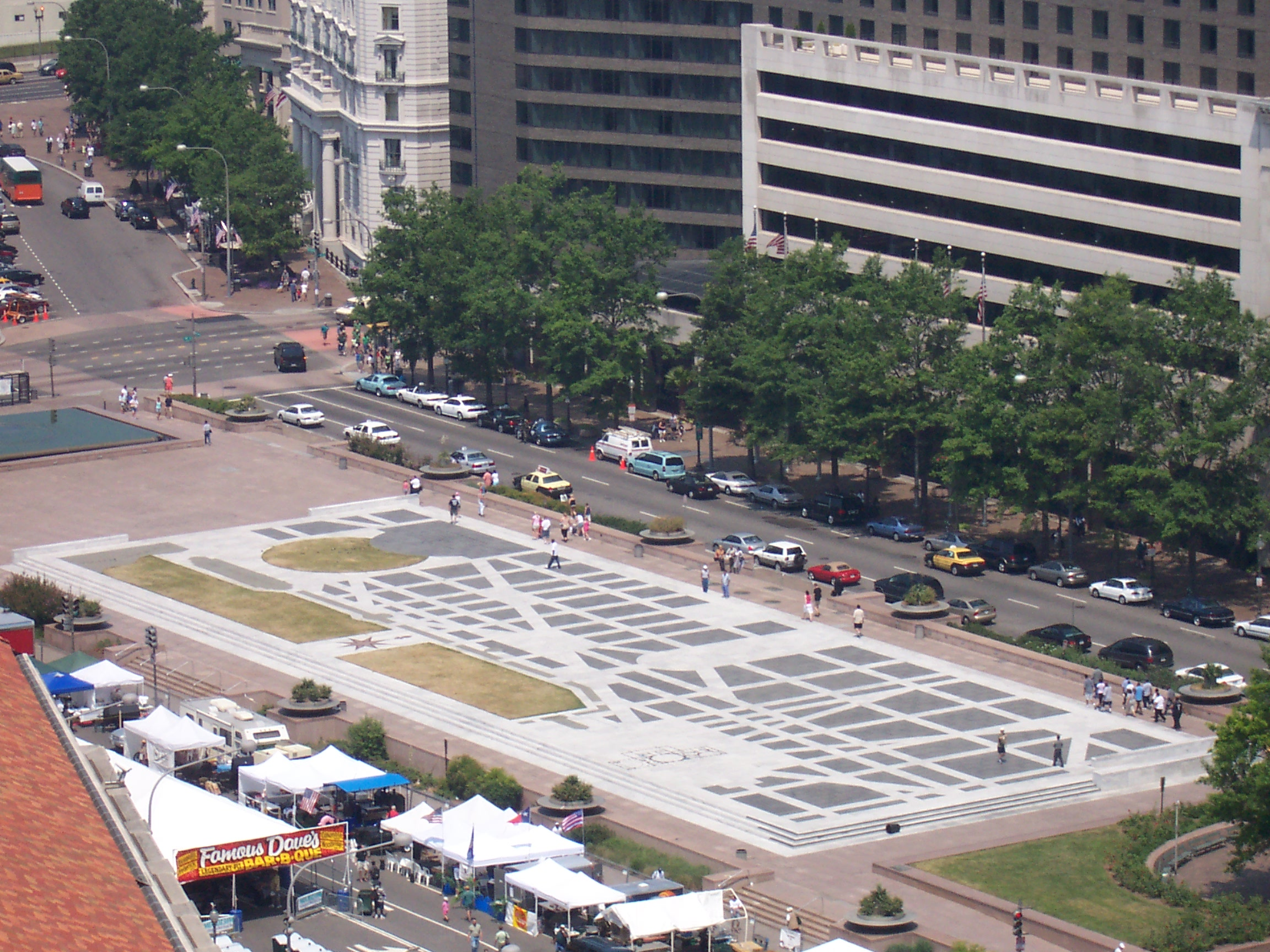
Depiction of the L'Enfant Plan in Freedom Plaza (2006)

== L'Enfant Plan in Freedom Plaza ==
In 1980, the Pennsylvania Avenue Development Corporation constructed Western Plaza along Pennsylvania Avenue in Northwest Washington, D.C. Designed by architect Robert Venturi and renamed in 1988 to Freedom Plaza, the plaza contains an inlay that partially depicts the L'Enfant Plan. The last line in an oval inscribed in the Plaza contains the words "By Peter Charles L'Enfant" written in a serif typeface.

== List of contributing parks ==
- Reservation 1 President's Park
- Reservation 2–6 National Mall; U.S. Capitol Grounds
- Reservation 7 Judiciary Square
- Reservation 8 Mount Vernon Square
- Reservation 9 Franklin Square
- Reservation 10 Lafayette Square
- Reservation 11 McPherson Square
- Reservation 12 Farragut Square
- Reservation 13 Rawlins Park
- Reservation 14 Lincoln Park
- Reservation 15 Stanton Square
- Reservation 16 Folger Park
- Reservation 17 Garfield Park
- Reservation 18 Marion Park
- Reservation 25–27 Washington Circle
- Reservation 32–33 Freedom Plaza
- Reservation 35–36 Market Square
- Reservation 38–43 Seward Square
- Reservation 44–49 Eastern Market Metro
- Reservation 59–61 Dupont Circle
- Reservation 62–64 Scott Circle
- Reservation 65–67 Thomas Circle
- Reservation 68–69 Gompers Park
- Reservation 152–154; 163–164 Logan Circle
- Reservation 332 West Potomac Park
- Reservation 333 East Potomac Park
- Reservation 334 Columbus Plaza
- Reservation 617 Pershing Park

== List of contributing avenues ==
- Connecticut Avenue
- Delaware Avenue
- Indiana Avenue
- Kentucky Avenue
- Louisiana Avenue
- Maryland Avenue
- Massachusetts Avenue
- New Hampshire Avenue
- New Jersey Avenue
- New York Avenue
- North Carolina Avenue
- Pennsylvania Avenue
- Georgia Avenue (renamed Potomac Avenue in 1908 and name reused on Brightwood Avenue)
- Rhode Island Avenue
- South Carolina Avenue
- Tennessee Avenue
- Vermont Avenue
- Virginia Avenue

== List of contributing streets ==
- 16th Street
- Constitution Avenue
- East Capitol Street
- Independence Avenue
- H Street
- K Street
- North Capitol Street
- South Capitol Street

== See also ==
- Architecture of Washington, D.C.
- Streets and highways of Washington, D.C.
