= Randolph Square =

Randolph Square was the name given in jest to Square No. 15 of the original L'Enfant Plan for Washington, D.C., after Andrew Ellicott had replaced Pierre (Peter) Charles L'Enfant as architect of the city, and the square was removed from the City's plan. The Randolph Square Matter was used as a euphemism for the dust up which eventually led George Washington to fire L'Enfant, and turn the design project over to Ellicott. The square would have been located near the current Shaw Library between 7th and 9th streets NW and R and S streets NW.

== History ==
After the Revolutionary War, George Washington involved himself personally in the building of a federal capital on the Potomac River, spanning the Maryland border with Virginia. After L'Enfant had served under Washington in the Revolutionary Army, Washington had hired the young architect to perform various services in New York, including converting the old city hall into Federal Hall, then the seat of Congress. In 1791, Washington appointed L'Enfant to design the layout of the new capital city, and Andrew Ellicott, another revolutionary veteran, to survey the existing land on which the city would be built. Also heavily involved in the planning of the capital city was Thomas Jefferson, whose image for the future capital was egalitarian and simple, even understated. It was the tension between Jefferson's simplistic model for the city and L'Enfant's ostentatious image of a grand capital city, as well as Jefferson's preference for Mr. Ellicott, which would lead to the downfall of L'Enfant, and Square No. 15.

Over the course of 1791–1792, L'Enfant created his plan for the city, full of symbolic design elements and sweeping vistas (see: L'Enfant Plan). Jefferson, though his humble image for the city's design contrasted strongly with the grand vision of L'Enfant, successfully coordinated the project and facilitated communication between L'Enfant, Ellicott, and Washington. But as L'Enfant began to run into road blocks related to cost and just how grand he intended the new city to become, he began to lose control of the project. Washington attempted to intervene on L'Enfant's behalf, but eventually the tide had turned too far against the French architect. The final straw occurred when L'Enfant invoked the power of eminent domain to demolish the partially constructed mansion of Daniel Carroll, a wealthy landholder from an even wealthier family, when the home protruded seven feet into the roadway at New Jersey Avenue SE. After that, and several other missteps, Jefferson approached Ellicott privately and entreated him to improve upon L'Enfant's plan for the city, and submit what would be called the Ellicott Plan to President Washington for approval. L'Enfant was effectively removed from the project and would spend the rest of his life living off of friends, his grand vision unrealized and uncredited.

== The Plans and Square No. 15 ==
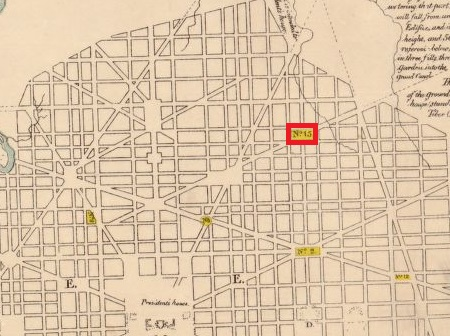
Detail of L'Enfant's 1791 plan for Washington with Square No. 15 outlined in red

L'Enfant's plan for the city included a simple grid plan, overlaid with diagonal avenues radiating from the President's House and the Capitol. Due to the large intersections created when diagonal streets met grid intersections, L'Enfant installed a number of squares and plazas (now traffic circles) to his design. Among these squares was a square bordered by 7th and 9th streets NW and by S and R streets NW. The Square, labeled "Square No. 15" on the L'Enfant map, was sliced at a perfect diagonal by Rhode Island Avenue NW.

Importantly for the story of Square No. 15, L'Enfant feared that the longest avenues, especially Massachusetts and Pennsylvania, would challenge elements of his design strategy, and therefore he created small angles at the larger intersections to break up the longest avenues. Among the most dramatic changes to the map, Rhode Island Avenue no longer crossed through Square No. 15 at the perfect angle that it had in the L'Enfant plan, and as such was eliminated from Washington, DC.

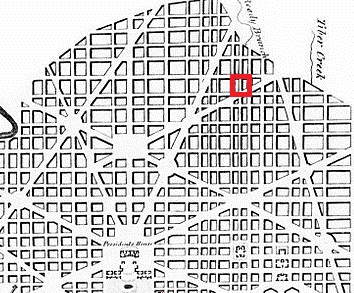
Detail of Ellicott's 1792 plan for Washington with the space where Square No. 15 would be, outlined in red

There are various theories as to why the changes were made to the city in Ellicott's new map. In her book, Washington in Maps, Iris Miller suggests it may have been due in no small part to Ellicott's lack of vision. "Examine Elements from L'Enfant's plan that Ellicott declined to grasp. One finds that Ellicott's engravings reflect the hand and mentality of an American-trained surveyor- not a European urban artist. In L'Enfant's late-seventeenth and early-eighteenth-century France, inventive composition of loosely gridded streets and radiating diagonal avenues was perfected by Andre Le Notre based upon philosophies of Descartes, Pascal and others. These responded to variations in topography that influenced spatial perception. Ellicott's regularized application of this plan neglected to account for design illusions that enhance urbanism." It cannot be ignored, however, that L'Enfant was extremely unpopular by the time Ellicott took over the project. He was known as "the crazy Frenchman," blew through his budget, made demands on officials and landowners alike, and made life generally unpleasant for many around him. Ellicott had been working with L'Enfant throughout the project and was a close personal confidant of Jefferson who had become a strong critic of the architect. It is unclear, therefore, whether those small changes to the map may have been made merely out of spite, or whether the spite was merely a side dish to the Iris Miller's explanation above, but the spite gave rise to the lost square's name.

The changes between the two maps were largely subtle, and therefore the four square block missing square was one of the more noticeable changes between L'Enfant and Ellicott's plan and became something of a symbol for those who had become fed up with L'Enfant's antics, of which there were many. Washington mourned the removal of his friend from the position of architect of the Capital city, and therefore praise of Jefferson for his hand in removing the L'Enfant were subtle. Rather than make direct reference to Jefferson, therefore, those who wished to gloat referred to the "Randolph Square" matter, referring to the disappearing square in the Ellicott Plan by the name of Jefferson's Mother, the well known Jane Randolph Jefferson.

== Randolph Square Today ==
Today, the area which would have been Randolph Square is located in the Shaw Neighborhood in Washington. The land once designated for the square includes an entry to the Shaw Metro Station and is bordered by the Shaw Public Library and Green Monster to the south.
