= Jefferson Pier =

Monument stone in Washington, D.C.

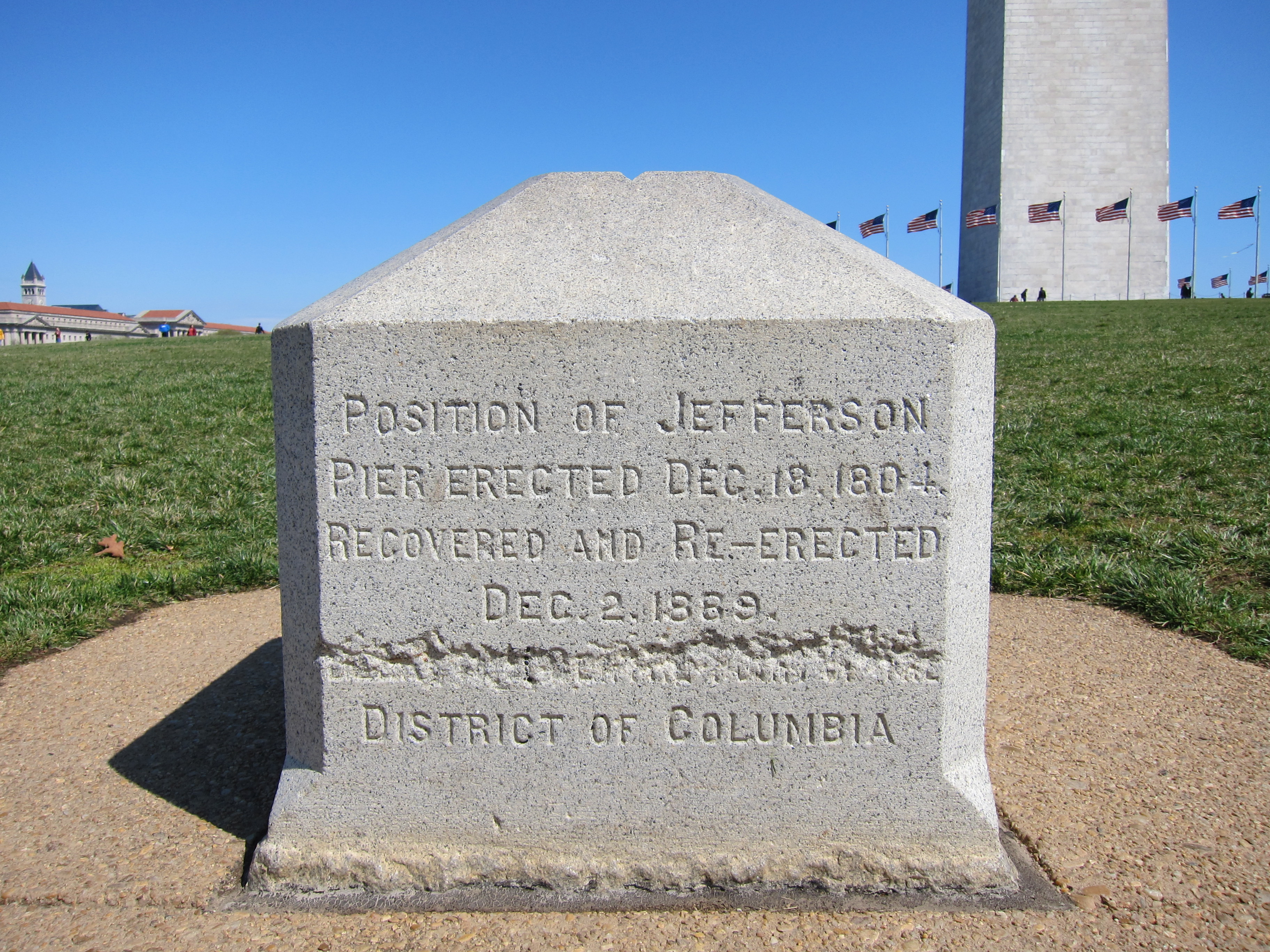
West side of Jefferson Pier with Washington Monument in background (April 2011)

Jefferson Pier, Jefferson Stone, or the Jefferson Pier Stone, (PIE-er) is a stone in Washington, D.C. that marks the second prime meridian of the United States even though it was never officially recognized, either by presidential proclamation or by a resolution or act of Congress. It is located 391 ft (119 m) WNW of the center of the Washington Monument.

== Location and inscription ==
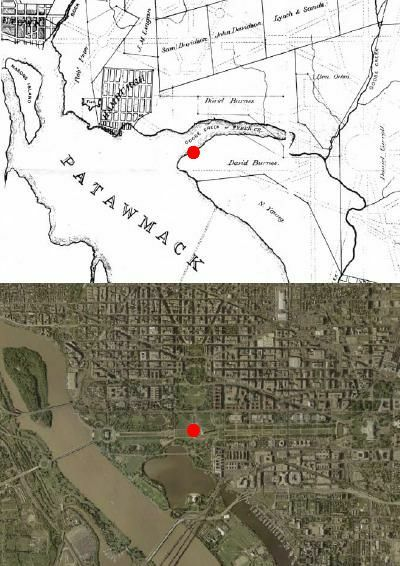
Location of Jefferson Pier on 1800 map (top) and modern satellite image (bottom).

The stone is on the National Mall almost due south of the center of the White House and the midline of 16th Street, NW, about due west of the center of the United States Capitol building, almost due north of the center of the Jefferson Memorial and 391 ft (119 m) WNW of the center of the Washington Monument. (Note: Coordinates for: Center of the White House: 38°53′51″N 77°02′12″W; Center of United States Capitol: 38°53′23″N 77°00′33″W; Center of Jefferson Pier: 38°53′23.29463″N 77°2′11.56″W; Center of Jefferson Memorial: 38°52′53″N 77°02′12″W)

The monument is a 2.25-by-2.25-foot (0.7 m × 0.7 m), 3-foot (0.9 m) tall granitic monolith with crossing longitudinal and latitudinal lines engraved on its upper surface and with a defaced inscription engraved on its west face that states:

POSITION OF JEFFERSON
PIER ERECTED DEC 18, 1804.
RECOVERED AND RE-ERECTED
DEC 2, 1889.
[fifth line chiseled out]
DISTRICT OF COLUMBIA

The chiseled-out fifth line reportedly once incorrectly stated: "BEING THE CENTRE POINT OF THE".

== Plan of Washington, D.C. ==
According to a notation on Pierre (Peter) Charles L'Enfant's 1791 "Plan of the city intended for the permanent seat of the government of the United States ... " (see L'Enfant Plan), Andrew Ellicott measured a prime meridian (longitude 0°0') through the future site of the U.S. Capitol. (Shortly after L'Enfant prepared this plan, its subject received the name "City of Washington".) Thomas Jefferson, who at the time was serving as the United States Secretary of State, supervised Ellicott's and L'Enfant's activities during the initial planning of the nation's capital city. Jefferson hoped that the United States would become scientifically as well as politically independent from Europe. He therefore desired that the new nation's capital city should contain a new "first meridian".

A prominent geometric feature of L'Enfant's plan was a large right triangle whose hypotenuse was a wide avenue (now part of Pennsylvania Avenue, NW) connecting the "President's house" (now the White House) and the "Congress house" (now the U.S. Capitol building). To complete the triangle, a line projecting due south from the center of the President's house intersected at a right angle a line projecting due west from the center of the Congress house. A 400 feet (122 m)-wide garden-lined "grand avenue" would travel for about 1 mile (1.6 km) along the east–west line. L'Enfant chose the west end of the "grand avenue" (at the triangle's southwest corner) to be the location of a future equestrian statue of George Washington for which the Continental Congress had voted in 1783. (Although the planned "grand avenue" became the portion of the National Mall that is now between the Capitol's grounds and the Washington Monument, the avenue was never constructed, and Washington's equestrian statue was not made until 1860 and ultimately placed elsewhere.)

== Planning for Washington Monument ==
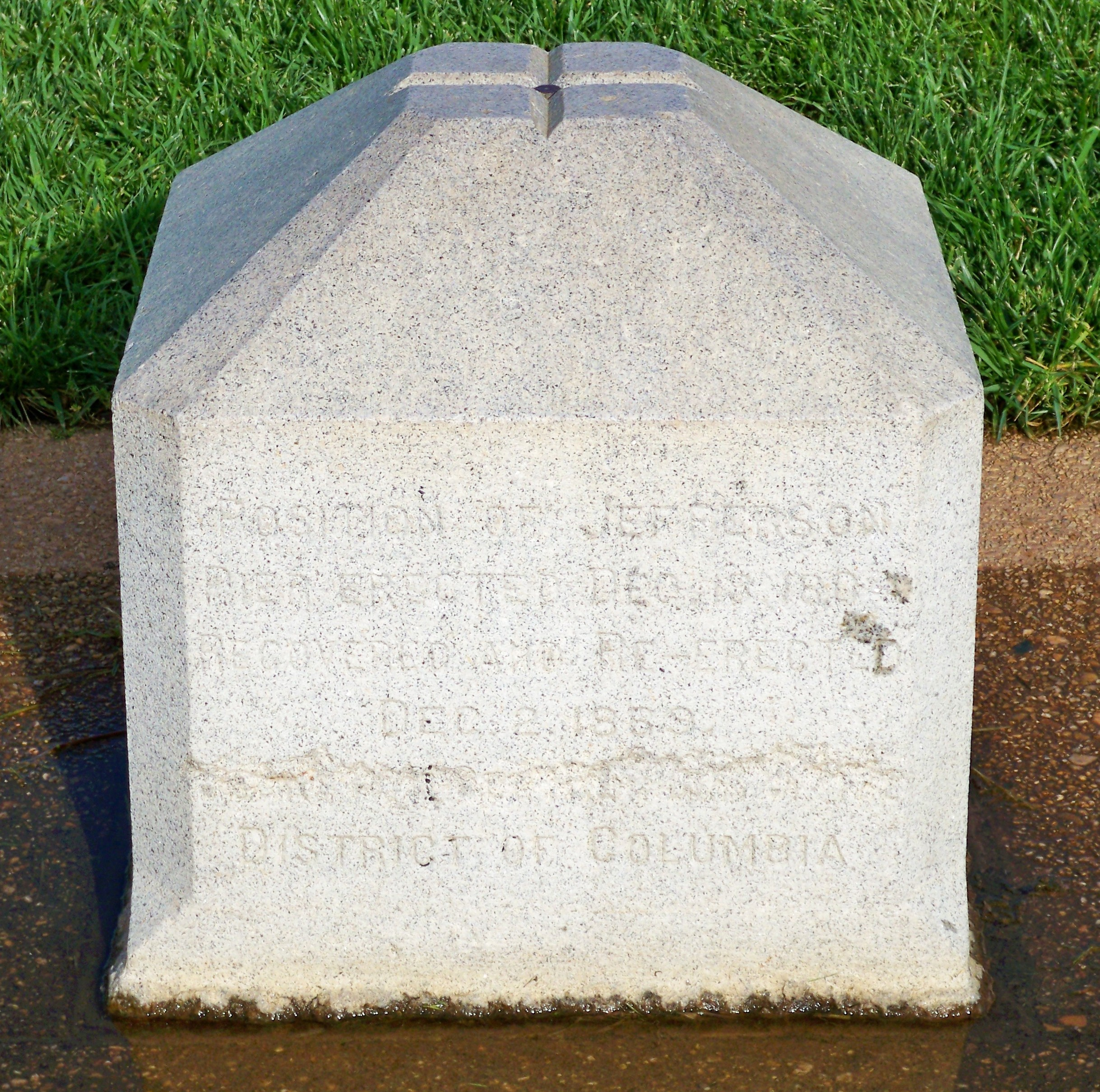
West side of the Jefferson Pier, showing crossed longitudinal and latitudinal lines on top of the monument (September 2009)

In 1804, Jefferson requested a survey of a meridian through the President's house while living in the house when serving as the President of the United States. It is not known why Jefferson requested a survey of a new meridian after he had previously directed a survey of a different one while serving as Secretary of State eleven years earlier.

In accordance with Jefferson's request, Isaac Briggs used a transit and equal altitude instrument to survey a new meridian line extending south from the center of the President's House that intersected a line extending due west from the planned center of the Capitol building. On October 15, 1804, Nicholas King, Surveyor of the City of Washington, erected at the intersection "a small pier, covered by a flat free stone, on which the lines are drawn." This established the Washington Meridian (sometimes termed the "16th Street Meridian"), now at a longitude 77°2'11.56" (NAD 83) west of the Royal Observatory, Greenwich. The pier and stone were located at the point that L'Enfant's plan had identified as being the future site of George Washington's equestrian statue. A pier is a massive pillar capable of supporting a great weight. Most of the length of a surveying pier is buried vertically in the ground for stability. Free stone is fine grained stone soft enough to carve with a chisel, yet has no tendency to split in any preferential direction.

Another stone, the Capitol Stone, was erected where the north–south line from the President's house intersected a line extending west from the south end of the Capitol, and a third stone, the Meridian Stone, was erected on the north–south meridian two miles north on Peters Hill, now Meridian Hill. Neither of the two latter stones survives. Due to errors either when the Jefferson Pier was initially surveyed or when it was replaced, its center is now 2.23 ft (0.680 m) south of the Capitol's centerline.

The 1804 stone marker replaced one of two wooden posts driven into the ground in 1793 at its site. The marker was originally located on the south bank of Tiber Creek, near the creek's confluence with the Potomac River. The area of the present National Mall west of the marker was under water until an engineering project that Peter Conover Hains directed from 1882 to 1891 created West Potomac Park. East of the marker, Tiber Creek was transformed into the Washington City Canal.

== During Washington Monument's construction ==
Barges used the marker as a mooring post during and after the first phase of Washington Monument's construction, which began in 1848. However, that usage was not the reason that the stone was named a "pier", because the surveyor who erected it had already used that term himself. The developers of the Washington Monument originally wanted the memorial to be located at the site of the Jefferson Pier. However, concerns about the bearing capacity of the soil prevented that from occurring. The marker served as benchmark when the Monument's construction began, but later disappeared from view.

Without recognizing the significance of the stone, the United States Army Corps of Engineers removed the original marker during 1872–1874 as part of a cleanup and grading of the grounds around the stump of the Washington Monument, which had not yet been finished. As part of this project, the Corps of Engineers filled in gullies, planted trees and constructed ornamental ponds and a broad carriage road around the stump. The project left in place about 20 inches of the stone's foundation.

== After Washington Memorial's completion ==
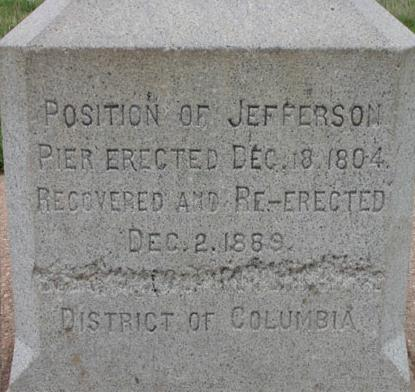
Inscription on west side of Jefferson Pier

On December 2, 1889, John Stewart, a draftsman acting on the instructions of Colonel O. H. Ernst, Officer in Charge of Public Buildings and Grounds, erected a replacement marker above the recovered foundation of the original marker. According to 1898 and 1899 reports, an inscription on the west side of the replacement marker stated: "Position of the meridian post, erected September 20, 1793, and position of the Jefferson stone pier, erected December 18, 1804, and recovered and reerected, December 2, 1889." (Silvio Bedini has written that these reports did not accurately describe the inscription.) The marker was lowered to within 8 inches of its top, so that the inscription was not visible above ground. In 1899, the ground on the west side of the pier was sloped so as to show the inscription on the Pier.

The meridian of the United States was changed to the center of the small dome of the Old Naval Observatory in 1850 (see Old Naval Observatory meridian) and finally replaced by the Greenwich Meridian as the legal prime meridian for both boundaries and navigation in 1912.

In 1920, Congress approved the placement of a new delineation stone on the Ellipse, the Zero Milestone, which is an itinerary marker from which official mileages from Washington would be determined. (Note: Coordinates of Zero Milestone 38°53′42″N 77°02′12″W (NGS says this should be correct with a couple of centimeters as of 2002.)) The new marker, a gift of the Lee Highway Association, was for some reason placed one foot west of the original meridian line extending north–south from the center of the White House.

In 1943, the Jefferson Memorial was completed due south of the White House on the Washington Meridian. As a result, the Jefferson Pier now stands on a north–south line that passes near the centers of the "President's house" and the memorial dedicated to the president for whom the Pier is named.

== Maintenance ==
An artifact sometimes confusing to and often overlooked by tourists, Jefferson Pier is maintained today by the National Park Service under its National Mall and Memorial Parks administrative unit. In 1890 a new monument, the Ellipse Meridian Stone, was placed by the Coast and Geodetic Survey in the center of the Ellipse in President's Park about 1,506 feet (459 m) north of the Jefferson Pier in a more protected area. (Note: Coordinates of Ellipse Meridian Stone 38°53′38″N 77°02′12″W (NGS says this should be correct within a centimeter as of 2002)) Theodolite measurements showed the new Ellipse Meridian Stone stood 26 inches (0.66 m) from the longitudinal line of the replacement Jefferson Stone, indicating one of the two markers was improperly located.
