= Washington meridians =

Meridians in the United States

Coordinates: 38.895103°N 77.0514428°W

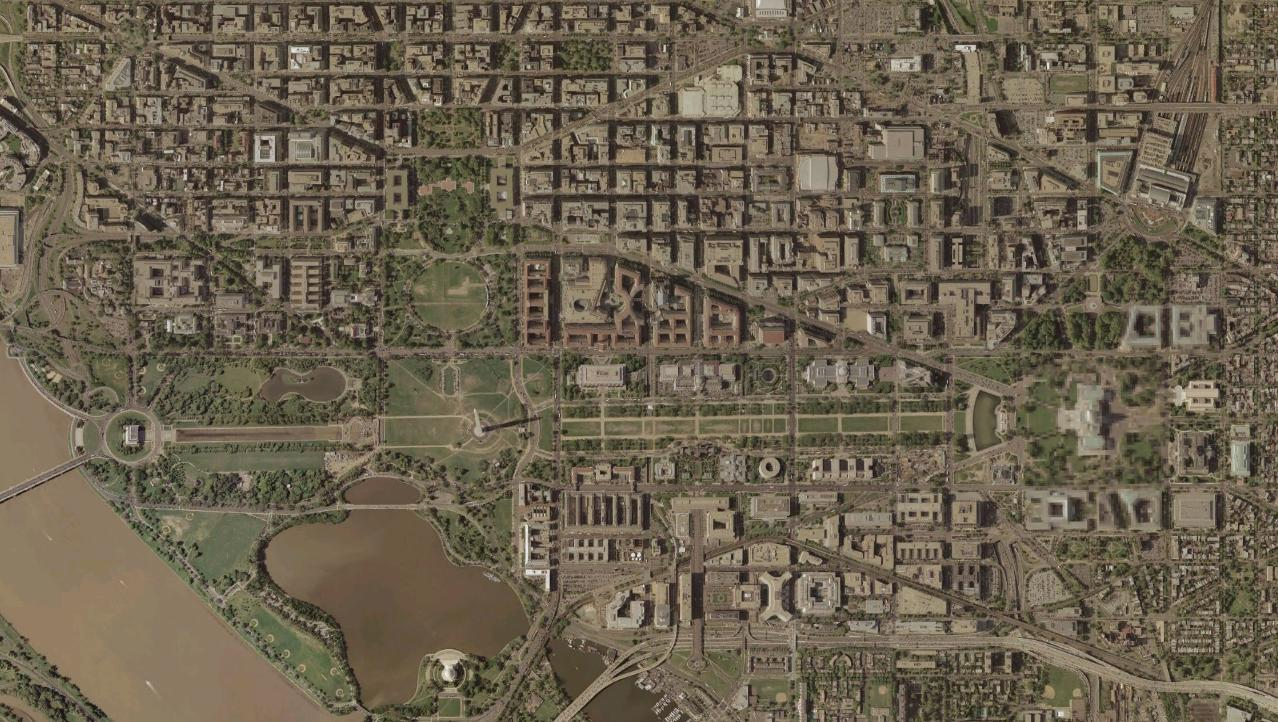
downtown Washington, D.C.

The Washington meridians are four meridians that were used as prime meridians in the United States which pass through Washington, D.C. The four that have been specified are:

1. through the Capitol
2. through the White House
3. through the old Naval Observatory
4. through the new Naval Observatory.

Their longitudes may be reported in three ways:

1. relative to the local vertical used by astronomic observations
2. relative to NAD 27 (North American Datum 1927), an ellipsoid of revolution that is at mean sea level beneath triangulation station Meades Ranch, Kansas (not Earth-centered);
3. relative to NAD 83, an Earth-centered ellipsoid of revolution with dimensions chosen to best fit the undulating (±100 m) geoid (world-wide mean sea level).

NAD83 longitude of the Capitol is about 1.1 arc seconds less than its NAD27 longitude; astronomic longitude there is about 4 arc seconds less than NAD83.

== Capitol meridian ==
Pierre (Peter) Charles L'Enfant specified the first meridian in his 1791 "Plan of the city intended for the permanent seat of the government of the United States . . ." (see: L'Enfant Plan). (Shortly after L'Enfant prepared this plan, its subject received the name "City of Washington".) His plan stated near its right side that the longitude of the Congress house, now called the Capitol, was 0,0°.

L'Enfant's plan contained the following explanatory note:

In order to execute the above plan, Mr. Ellicott drew a true meridian line by celestial observation, which passes through the area intended for the Congress-House; this line he crossed by another line due east and west and which passes through the same area. These lines were accurately measured, and made the basis on which the whole plan was executed. He ran all the lines by a transit instrument, and determined the acute angles by actual measurement, and left nothing to the uncertainty of the compass.

The longitude of the center of the Capitol's dome (completed in 1863 during the Civil War) is now given by the National Geodetic Survey as 77°00′32.6″W (NAD 83).

== White House meridian ==
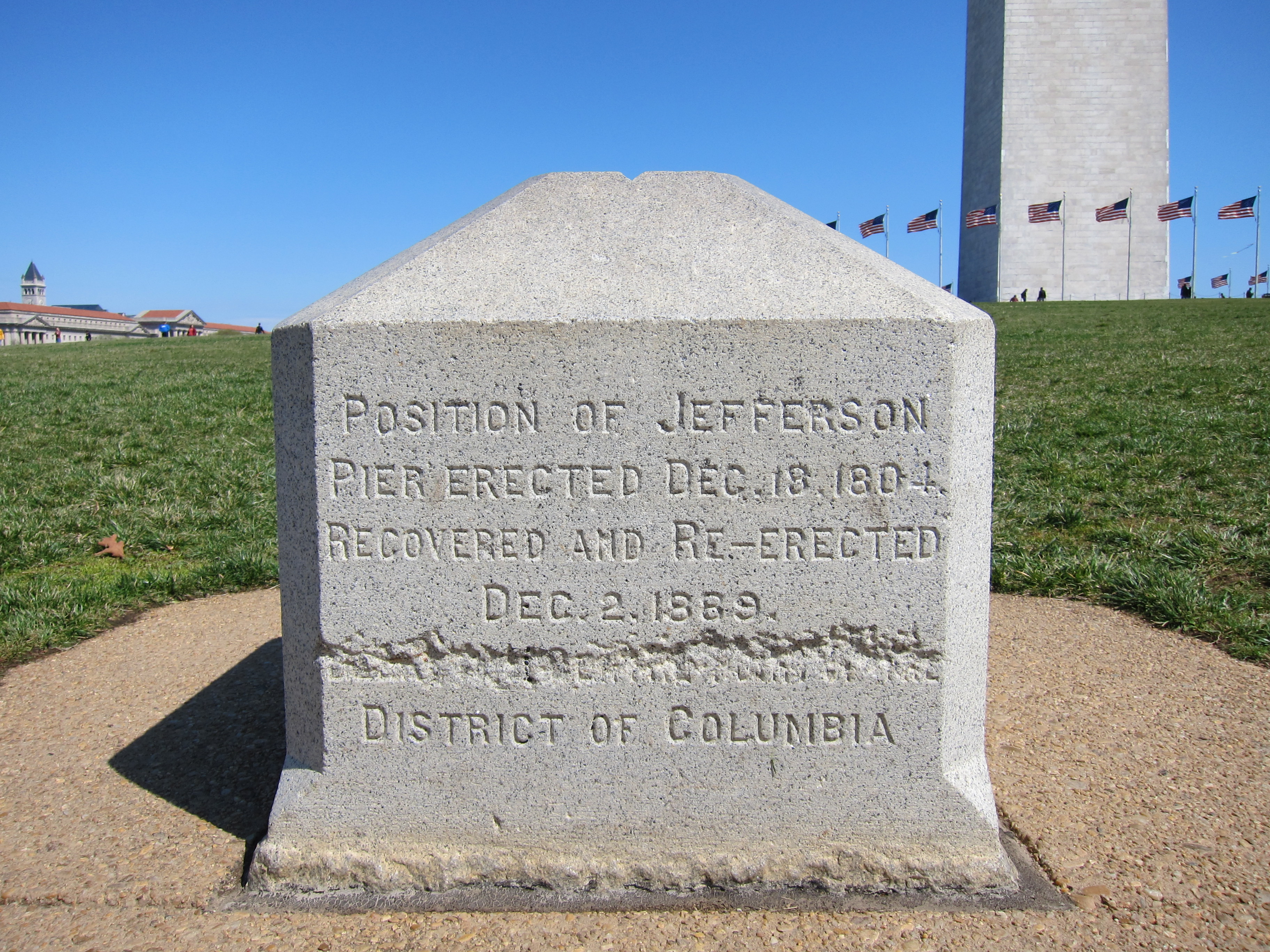
West side of Jefferson Pier in April 2011 with Washington Monument in background.

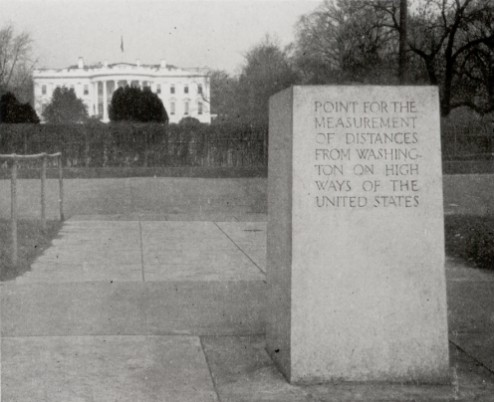
Zero Milestone, 1923, looking north toward the White House.

L'Enfant planned Washington around a right triangle, having its 90° vertex at an equestrian statue of George Washington, its eastern vertex at the "Congress house" and its northern vertex at the President's House, now named the "White House". (This would place L'Enfant's statue 0.36 meters (1 ft 2 in) north of the latitude of the Capitol.)

The west side of L'Enfant's triangle forms a natural prime meridian passing through the center of the President's house. The following ten features on and near this "Washington Meridian" are listed from south to north:

- The center of the Jefferson Memorial, completed on the meridian in 1943.
- The Jefferson Pier. In 1793 Secretary of State Thomas Jefferson surveyed and marked with a wooden post the southwest vertex of L'Enfant's triangle, establishing the second Washington meridian, the one through the President's house. The wooden post was replaced by the Jefferson Pier in 1804, while Jefferson was President of the United States. After removal and replacement several times, it was permanently replaced in 1889 by a 2-foot-square (0.6 m), 2-foot-tall, granite pier, now 390 feet (119 m) WNW of the center of the Washington Monument. NGS gives its longitude as 77°02′11.56258″W (NAD 83) as of 2002 (likely error less than a centimeter). Azimuth to the Capitol is 89.98 degrees, a discrepancy of just under a meter.
- The German-American Friendship Garden on the Washington Monument grounds, dedicated on November 15, 1988.
- The Meridian Stone. Set In 1890 at the center of the Ellipse, it was intended to be on the same meridian. It is an 18-inch-square (46 cm) granite post set flush with the ground. NGS gives its longitude as 77°02′11.55880″W (NAD 83) as of 2002 (likely error less than a centimeter).
- The Zero Milestone. Set in 1923 on the north side of the Ellipse, it was intended to be on the same meridian and to be the zero mileage point for all United States roads (but never was). It is a granite pillar about 18 inches (46 cm) square and about 3.5 feet (1.1 m) tall. NGS gives its longitude as 77°02′11.57375″W (NAD 83) as of 2002 (likely error less than two centimeters).

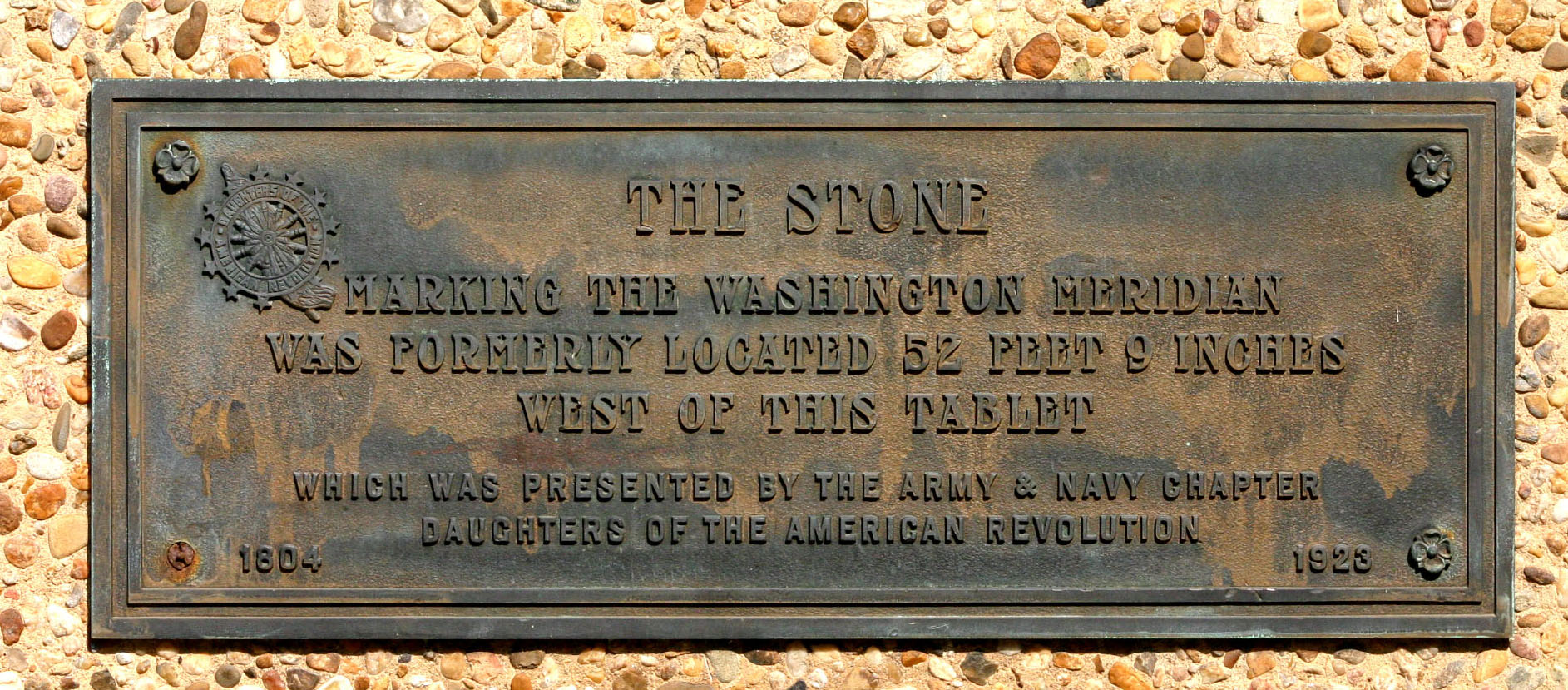
Tablet facing 16th Street, NW, on west wall of Meridian Hill Park in 2006. The tablet states that a Washington Meridian marker stone was formerly located 52 feet 9 inches (16.1 m) west of the tablet.

- The center of the White House.
- Clark Mills' equestrian statue of President Andrew Jackson in Lafayette Park, erected on the meridian in 1853 (see: Andrew Jackson (Mills)).
- 16th Street Northwest, which extends due north from the White House. The meridian is sometimes identified as the "16th Street Meridian" because of the location of this street.
- Meridian Hill. In 1804, a small freestone obelisk was placed at the crest of a hill, 1.5 miles (2.4 km) north of the President's House. The marker, which no longer exists, was at the northern end of 16th Street, just north of Florida Avenue, before 16th Street was extended northward about 1890, covering it up. The park along the east side of 16th Street where the obelisk once stood still bears the name Meridian Hill Park.

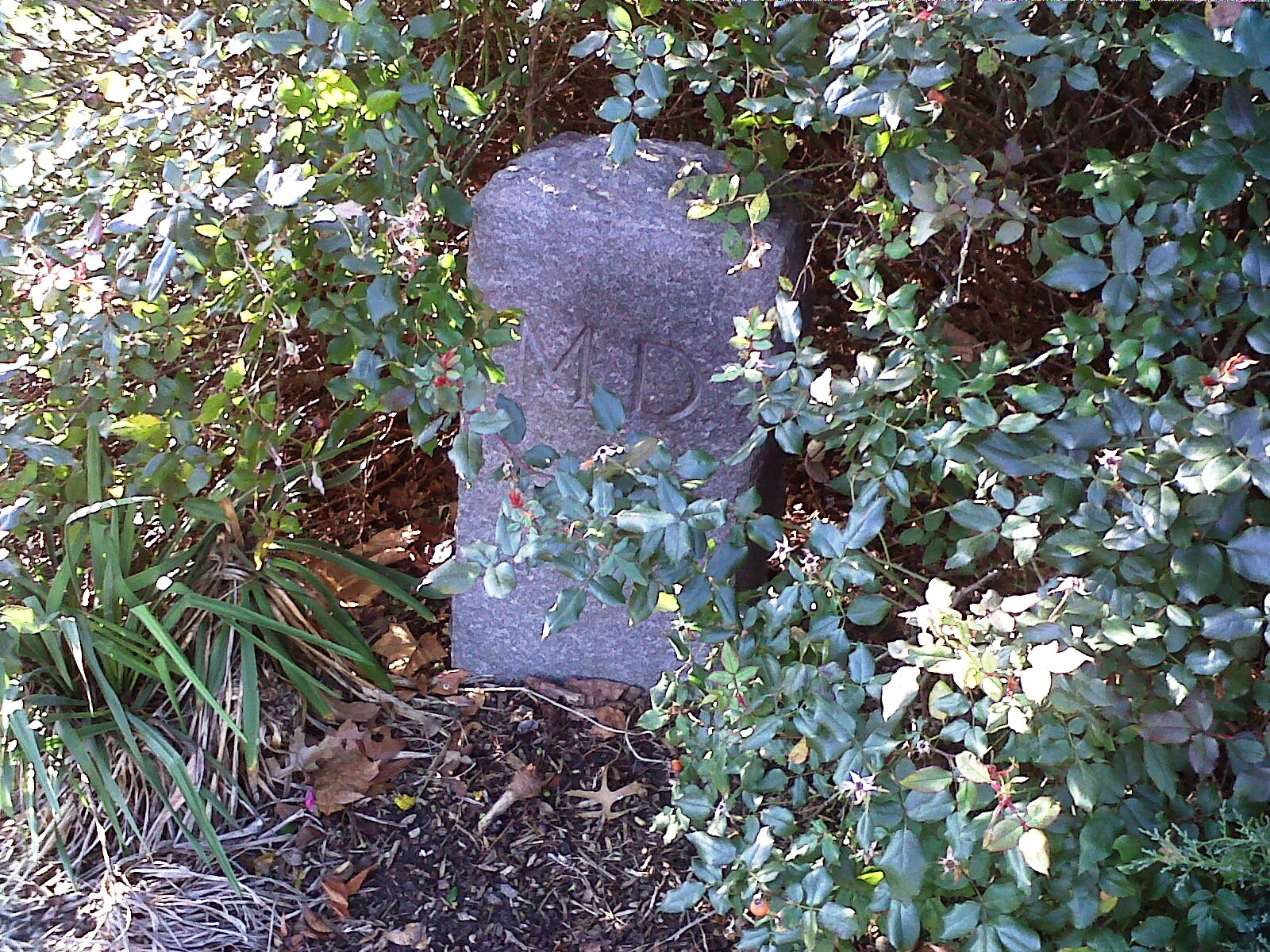
Entrance marker stone near Silver Spring in traffic circle (Blair Circle) in December 2011

- District of Columbia entrance marker stone (approximately 66 feet (20 m) east of this meridian) near Silver Spring in traffic circle (Blair Circle) at intersection of 16th Street Northwest, Eastern Avenue Northwest, N. Portal Drive Northwest and Colesville Road.

== Old Naval Observatory meridian ==
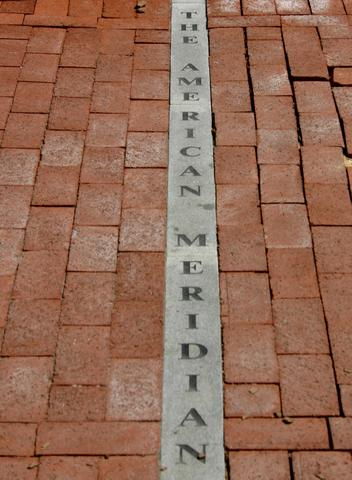
Meridian four blocks north of Old Naval Observatory, looking south in August 2005.

The third meridian was defined on September 28, 1850, by Congress: "[T]he meridian of the observatory at Washington shall be adopted and used as the American meridian for all astronomical purposes and ... the meridian of Greenwich shall be adopted for all nautical purposes." The observatory decided that this meridian passed through the center of the original (small) dome atop the main building of the Old Naval Observatory, now abandoned southwest of the corner of E and 23rd Streets in Foggy Bottom (north of the Lincoln Memorial and west of the White House). The observatory adopted 77°2′48.0″W for its meridian in the American Ephemeris and Nautical Almanac for the years 1855 to 1869 (as 5^{h}8^{m}11.2^{s}). In 1897, well after the observatory closed in 1892, the Coast and Geodetic Survey reported that its meridian was 77°3′2.3″ west of Greenwich, which was quoted for the next 50 years in the list of observatories in the Almanac (as 5^{h}8^{m}12.15^{s}). When referred to later datums, this meridian has been variously specified as 77°3′6.119″W or 77°3′6.276″W (both presumably NAD 27). If NAD27, the latter would be 77°3′5.194″W (NAD 83) which seems to be within a few meters of the actual longitude, at worst. This meridian was repealed by Congress on August 22, 1912, to allow the Greenwich meridian to become the legal prime meridian of the United States.

=== Western state borders ===
Many western states have borders that are meridians of "longitude west of Washington", that is, west of the legal 1850 meridian through the Old Naval Observatory. However, their present boundaries follow the subsequently surveyed boundary, even when inaccurately marked a few miles (kilometers) east or west of the meridian in the statute. Other western states have meridians relative to Greenwich (Alaska, California, Oklahoma, Texas) or relative to a river or lake (Arkansas, Louisiana, Minnesota, Missouri, Oregon, Washington state).

The following meridians west of Washington are listed east to west, along with the appropriate boundary of the present state. The date of the meridian's definition is in parentheses (all in the 1860s). All states were territories of the same name when their meridians were specified except as noted. States without dates have boundaries dependent on the neighboring state with a date listed immediately above it.

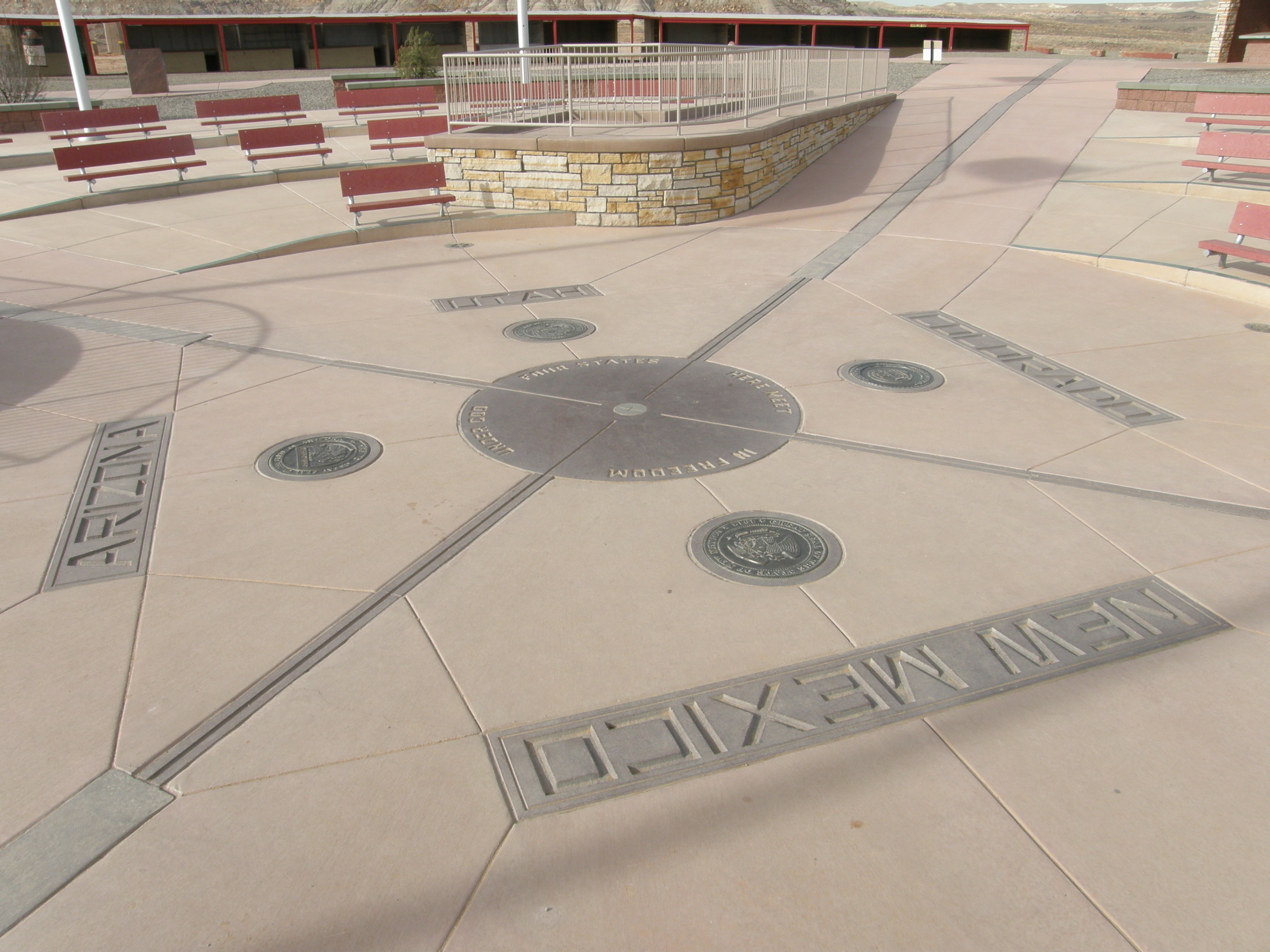
Four Corners Monument 32° west of Washington Meridian, after 2010 reconstruction.

Degree	Boundary
17°	SW Arkansas (south of the Red River)
17°	E Texas (between the Red and Sabine Rivers)
17°	NW Louisiana (north of the Sabine River)
25°	W Kansas (January 29, 1861) as a state
25°	E Colorado (February 28, 1861), NE not dependent on Kansas
25°	SW Nebraska
27°	E Montana (March 3, 1863) as Idaho Territory
27°	E Wyoming (March 3, 1863) as Idaho Territory
27°	NW Nebraska
27°	W North Dakota as Dakota Territory
27°	W South Dakota as Dakota Territory
32°	W Colorado (February 28, 1861)
32°	SE Utah
32°	E Arizona (February 24, 1863)
32°	W New Mexico
34°	SW Montana (May 26, 1864)
34°	W Wyoming (July 25, 1868), SW not dependent on Montana
34°	SE Idaho
34°	NE Utah
37°	E Nevada (May 5, 1866) as a state (39° → 38° → 37°)
37°	W Utah
39°	NW Montana (May 26, 1864)
39°	NE Idaho
43°	W Nevada (1864)

== New Naval Observatory meridian ==
The fourth meridian was through the clock room of the new Naval Observatory, 2.3 mi (3.7 km) northwest of the White House, at 77°3′56.7″W (1897) or 77°4′2.24″W (NAD 27) or 77°4′1.16″W (NAD 83). The clock room is a small building at the exact center of the 1,000 ft (300 m) radius observatory grounds, whose northern entrance is at 34th Street and Massachusetts Avenue. It was used in the Almanac for the years 1898–1950 as the independent variable of time for a few tables (even though Washington's civil time since 1883 had been that of the standard time zone GMT−5 hours (75°W)).

== See also ==
- Washington mean time
- International Meridian Conference
