= 37th meridian west from Washington =

Archaic line of longitude

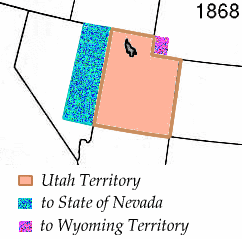
The territorial change which created the boundary usage of the meridian

The 37th meridian west from Washington is an archaic meridian based on the Washington meridian. It is currently located at approximately 114 degrees, 3 minutes west of the Greenwich meridian. The meridian is used as a boundary for two states.

== Usage as a boundary ==
The first and only usage of the meridian as a boundary occurred in 1866. In that year, the state of Nevada's eastern boundary was pushed one degree further east to the current boundary. This also had the effect of pushing the Utah Territory's western boundary further east. Utah would become a state in 1896.
