= Lock-keeper's house =

A lock-keeper's house is the residence of a lock keeper.

Lock-keeper's house may also refer to:

- Lock-Keeper's House (Cedar Point, Virginia), United States
- Lockkeeper's House (Davis County, Iowa), United States
- Lockkeeper's House (Washington, D.C.), United States
