= Lock keeper =

Person whose job is to operate a lock on a waterway

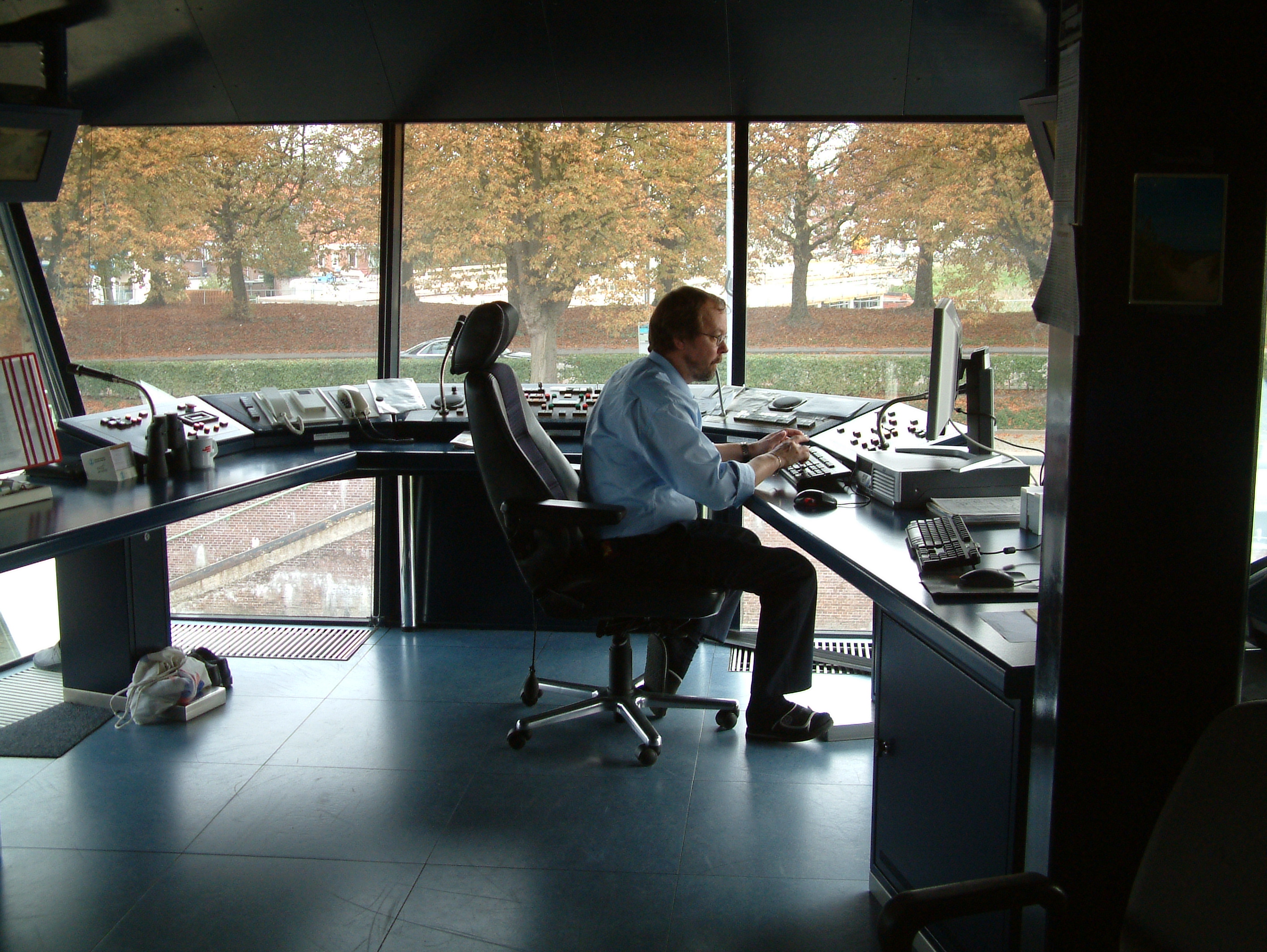
The lock keeper at the Grote Merwedesluis in Gorinchem, the Netherlands, at the southern terminus of the Merwede canal.

A lock keeper, lock tender, or lock operator looks after a canal or river lock, operating it and if necessary maintaining it or organizing its maintenance. Traditionally, lock keepers lived on-site, often in small purpose-built cottages. A lock keeper may also be the operator for the lock's weir and, in many cases lock keepers play an important role in moderating and controlling water levels in response to drought and heavy rain. With the decline in commercial traffic the occupation is dying out on inland waterways, at least in Britain. Many previously staffed locks are now unstaffed. At large locks on large rivers, several locktenders report to the lockmaster, the manager in charge.

== Pay and other compensation ==
The Lehigh Coal & Navigation Company in 1900 paid their lock keepers US$18 per month, with a rent free house. They often had small stores to sell groceries to passing boats and, among their duties, made minor repairs along the canal and at locks.

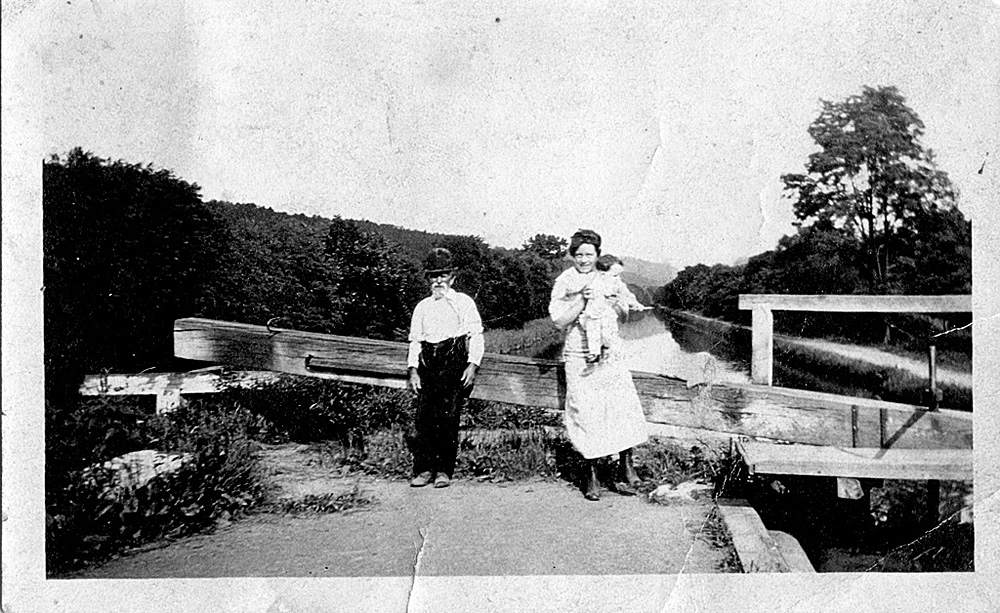
The lock keeper of Lock 56 (Thomas Donegan, on the left) on the Chesapeake and Ohio Canal.

On the Chesapeake and Ohio Canal the lock keeper had a rent free house, an acre of land for a garden, and was paid a base of $150 a year. If he kept more than one lock, it was $50 for each extra lock, with a maximum of 3 locks.

== Duties ==
Lockkeepers were on call 24 hours a day during the boating season.

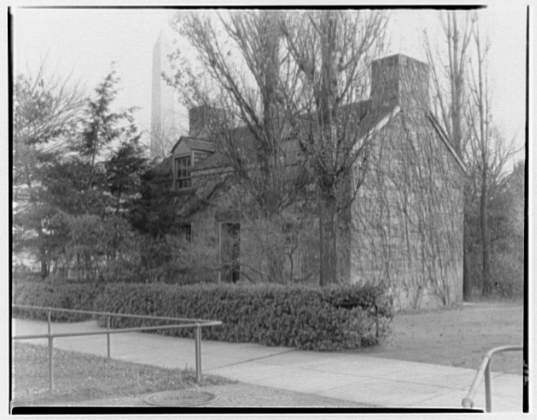
The Lockkeeper's House on the National Mall in Washington, D.C. once housed the lockkeeper of the Washington City Canal.

On the Chesapeake and Ohio Canal, the lock keepers were required to remove the windlasses from all lock paddles at night, to prevent unauthorized use. But they had to get up and man the lock if a boat came through at night.

Lock keepers had to enforce company rules against independent and wily boat captains. In some cases, they had to check waybills that the boats had. They also were responsible for the level (canal pound) by their lock, to fix leaks and other minor repairs.

Some lock keepers simply left the job and disappeared. In June 1848, when Asa Aud had taken French leave, William Elgin the district superintendent, appointed John Boozell as tender of Lock 25 on the Chesapeake and Ohio Canal.

Often lock keepers sold alcohol on the side, one notable example being A. S. Adams of Lock 33 (Harpers Ferry) on the Chesapeake and Ohio Canal. where the Salty Dog Tavern was known for its availability of liquor and easiness of women.

To help a boat get out of a lock (going downstream) the lockkeeper would sometimes provide a swell, that is, opening the paddle valves (wickets) on the upstream gates so that the rush of water would flush the boat out. Some wily lock keepers would demand money from the boatmen for this "service". If a boat ran aground between locks, they would sometimes ask a passing boat (going upstream) to tell the next lock keeper to give an extra heavy swell, by opening all the wickets on the upstream lock thus raising the water level temporarily, so that they could get unstuck.

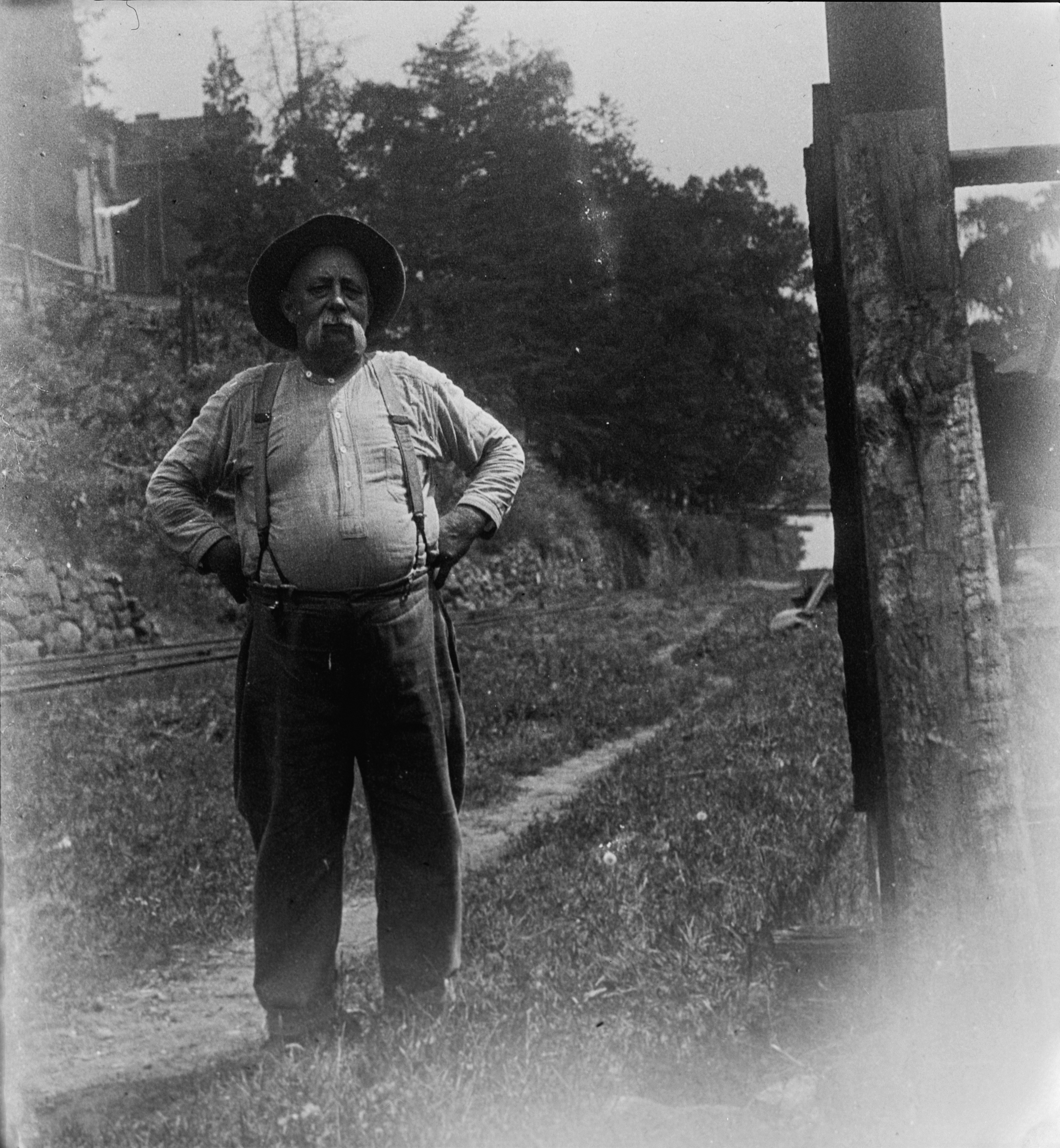
Man tending inclined plane 7 East on the Morris Canal

The Morris Canal had inclined planes as well as locks, and the former required keepers also, although one cannot exactly call them "lock keepers" since they did not tend a lock, but an inclined plane which did much of the same function as a lock, lifting or lowering boats from one level to another, albeit with a cradle which carried the boats.

== Incidents ==
There were often conflicts between the boat captains and the lock keepers. In July 1874 on the Chesapeake and Ohio Canal, there was a notorious incident, where the boat's tow line caught and tore the lock railing and the captain of the boat insisted on scrubbing the boat's sides with a broom while still in the lock. The lock keeper demanded that the captain remove the boat from the lock, which he refused. The lock keeper's son opened one of the gates pinning the captain's son against the boat. There was soon a fist fight, and the captain's wife knocked one of the keeper's sons off the boat. Things escalated to rock throwing, clubbing, and the lock keeper's sons returned with a shotgun and revolver, which misfired. When the boat did resume its journey, the lock keeper followed on horseback, all the way to Cumberland (the end of the canal) with a club threatening to settle things.

There were plenty of incidents with negligent lock keepers. On September 11, 1895 at Lock 22, the boat Excelsior arrived, and tried to lock through. The lock keeper was so drunk, he opened the lower gate paddles too early. The boat hit the mitre sill, broke in half, and sank with its 113 tons of coal. Richard A. Moore, the owner of the boat, collected over $1,300 in damages, and the lock keeper was fired.

In England, there has been recent controversy over the Environment Agency's attempt to remove resident lock keepers on the River Thames. This has been met with widespread disapproval.

== Promotions ==
Many people who began as lock keepers were later promoted in the company. Many district superintendents of the Chesapeake and Ohio Canal began as lock keepers, but because of their good reputation, were promoted. These included Elgin and John Y. Young in the 1830s and 1840s, John Lambie in the 1840s. A. K. Stake began at locks 41–41 from 1847 to 1848, Lewis G. Stanhop at locks 41–42 also in 1848, and Overton G. Lowe at Lock 56 when the canal opened to Cumberland — these three individuals were later promoted and continued working for the Canal company well into the 1870s.

== Modern locks ==
Locks on commercial canals are usually power operated. The lock keeper, who no longer lives on site, controls the whole process from a control room overlooking the lock. In the modern age the control of traffic and locks on canals is being centralised. A single control centre can remotely operate several locks and moveable bridges in a wide area, overseeing the process using CCTV. For example, the Tilburg control centre in the Netherlands will remotely control 18 locks and 28 moveable bridges from 2015 on. This allows for a reduction in manpower while still providing round-the-clock service to water traffic. As the controller now has overview over the traffic moving through one lock after another, he can anticipate the arrival of boats by turning the lock in advance, having boats wait for another coming from behind to handle them simultaneously, or decide whether to turn a lock empty for a boat going in one direction or to wait for one going in the other direction.

On the River Thames, the traditional locks have been retained, though the majority are now motorised, using a hydraulic system to operate the gates; however, when unpowered, the gates and sluices can still be operated by use of the pedestal cranks at either end of the lock chamber.

== Quotations ==
The floral tastes of the lock-keeper generally make Sonning Lock very bright and gay.

— Charles Dickens (1812–1870)

Is there a spot more lovely than the rest,
By art improved, by nature truly blest?
A noble river at its base running,
It is a little village known as Sonning.

— James Sadler, Sonning lock keeper (1845–1885).

== See also ==
- Bridge tender
- Lock-keeper's house
- The Kentucky River Museum is located in a former lock operator's dwelling.
