= Tiber Creek =

Tiber Creek: Tyber Creek; Goose Creek
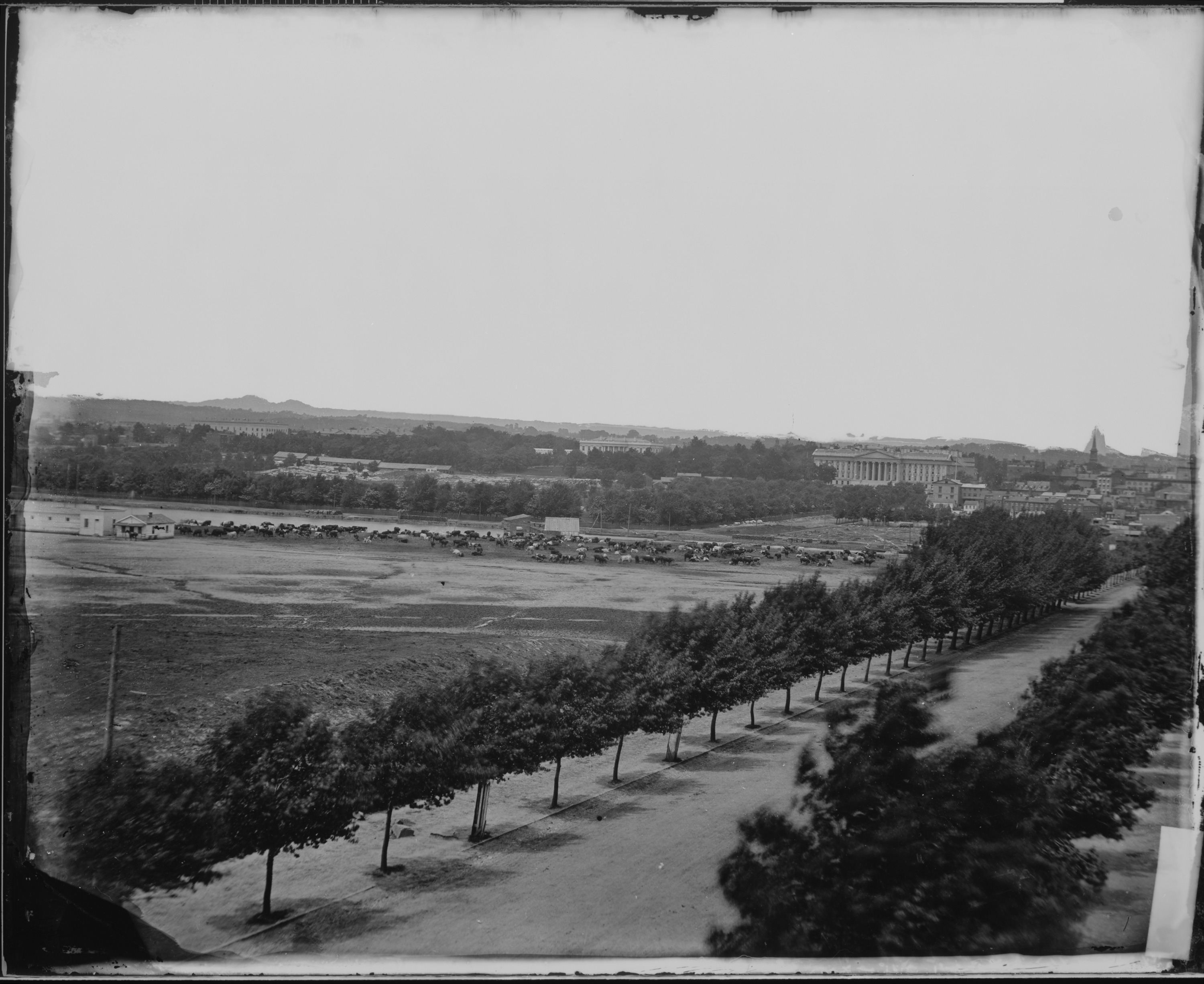
- ^{National Archives at College Park} White Lot during the war, Washington D.C. Shows Tiber River, now "B" St., c. 1860–1865.
- Etymology: Tiber River in Rome, Italy

Location
- Country: United States
- Federal district: District of Columbia

Physical characteristics
- Source
  - location: Shaw neighborhood
  - coordinates: 38°54′56″N 77°01′13″W
- Mouth
  - location: National Mall
  - coordinates: 38°53′26″N 77°02′21″W

Basin features
- River system: Potomac River

Tiber Creek or Tyber Creek, originally named Goose Creek, is a tributary of the Potomac River in Washington, D.C. It was a free-flowing creek until 1815, when it was channeled to become part of the Washington City Canal. Presently, it flows under the city in tunnels, including under Constitution Avenue NW.

== History ==
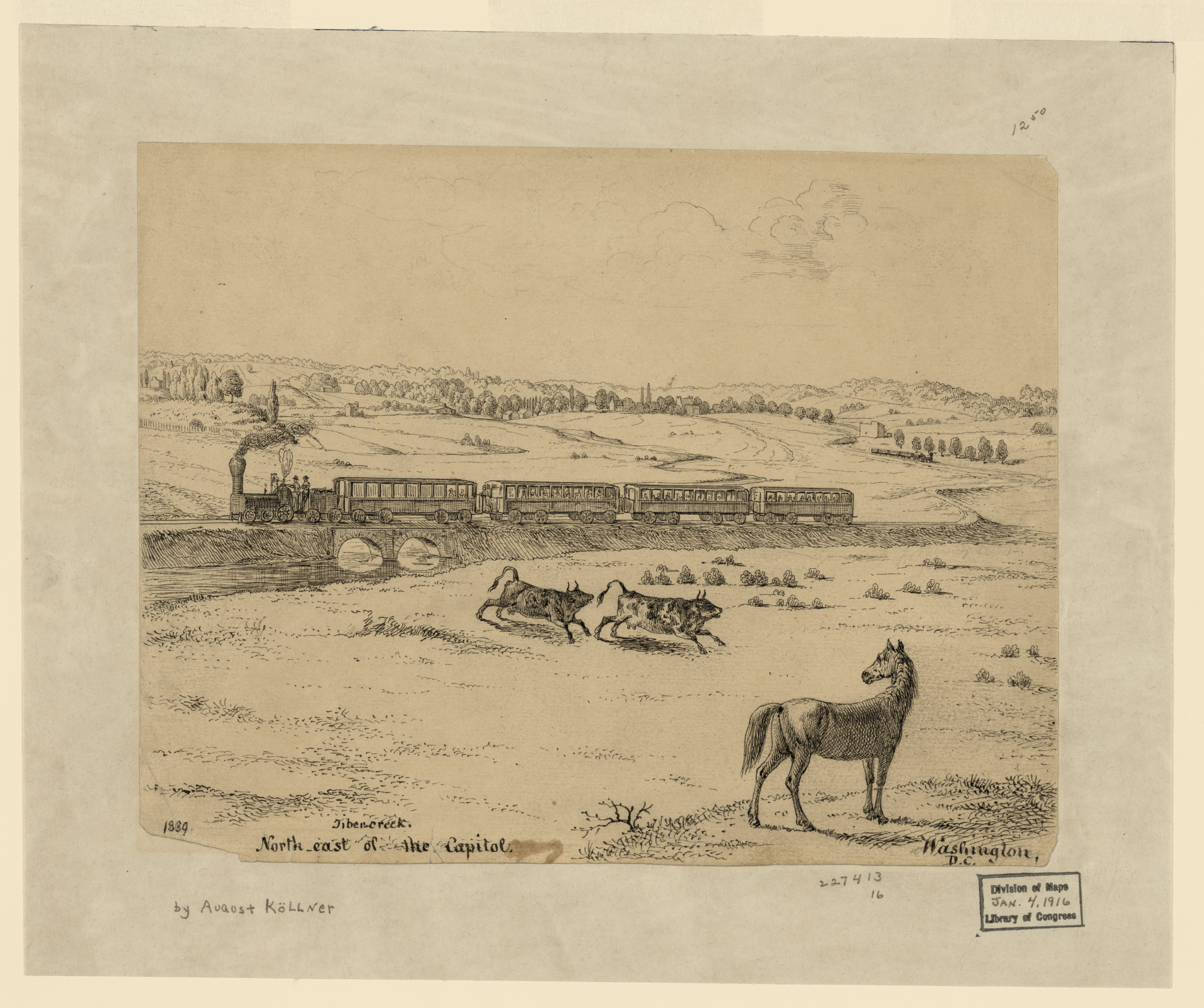
Landscape showing a train crossing Tiber Creek, northeast of the Capitol (not pictured) in Washington, DC in 1839

Originally named Goose Creek, it was renamed during the late 1600s by settler Francis Pope, who owned a 400-acre (1.6 km^{2}) farmstead along the banks of the creek. Dubbing his land "Rome", Pope renamed the creek after the Italian city's river.

Using the original Tiber Creek for commercial purposes was part of Pierre (Peter) Charles L'Enfant's 1791 "Plan of the city intended for the permanent seat of the government of the United States . . .". The idea was that the creek could be widened and channeled into a canal to the Potomac. By 1815 the western portion of the creek became part of the Washington City Canal, running along what is now Constitution Avenue. By the 1840s, when Washington had no separate storm drain and sewer system, the Washington City Canal had become a notorious open sewer. When Alexander "Boss" Shepherd joined the D.C. Board of Public Works in 1871, he and the Board engaged in a massive, albeit uneven, series of infrastructure improvements, including grading and paving streets, planting trees, installing sewers and laying out parks. One of these projects enclosed Tiber Creek and the Washington City Canal. A German immigrant engineer named Adolf Cluss, also on the Board, is credited with constructing a tunnel from Capitol Hill to the Potomac "wide enough for a bus to drive through to put Tiber Creek underground."

Many of the buildings on the north side of Constitution Avenue apparently are built on top of the creek, including the Internal Revenue Service Building (IRS), part of which is built on wooden piers sunk into the wet ground along the creek course. The low-lying topography there contributed to the flooding of the National Archives Building (Archives I in Washington, D.C.), IRS headquarters, and William Jefferson Clinton Federal Building that forced their temporary closure beginning in late June 2006. Until the mid-1990s, land near the intersection of 14th Street and Constitution Avenue was a parking lot because the underground water was too difficult to deal with. During construction of the Ronald Reagan Building (1990–98), the engineers diverted the water. The dewatering then reduced the water level underneath the IRS building which caused the wooden piers to lose stability and part of the IRS building foundation to sink.

A pub near Tiber Creek's historic course north of Capitol Hill was named after it. The Bistro Bis restaurant now occupies the Tiber Creek Pub's former location. A lock keeper's house from the Washington branch of the Chesapeake and Ohio Canal remains at the southwest corner of Constitution Avenue and 17th Street, NW, near the former mouth of Tiber Creek, and the western end of the Washington City Canal.

According to General James Wilkinson's memoirs, "I may be excused for mention another incident, which deeply interested [...] my family. My father, to preserve his health and property, purchased 500 acres of land lying on the Tyber and Potomack, which probably comprises the President's house; but at the time, about 1762, the present seat of government was considered so remote from the early settlements of the province, that my mother objected to the removal on accounts of the distance, and my father transferred the property to Thomas Johns, esq. a friend and contemporary, of his neighborhood, to whose family it proved an auspicious contract; but in this case, the benefactor did not long enjoy the prosperity he had promoted."

Presently, the stream flowing under the city is often referred to as Tiber Creek though its common past with the Canal is acknowledged.

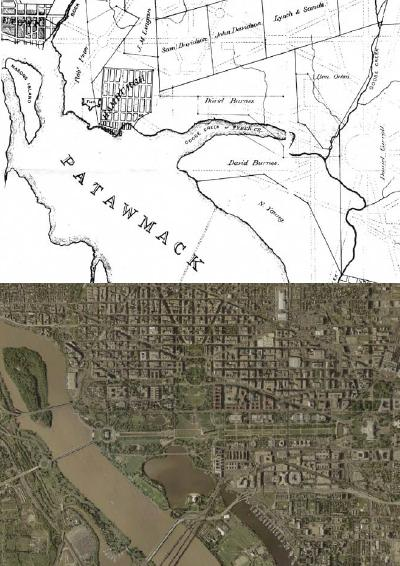
Tiber/Goose Creek around 1800, and the modern shorelines of the Potomac River

Andrew Ellicott's revision of L'Enfant's Plan, showing Washington City Canal

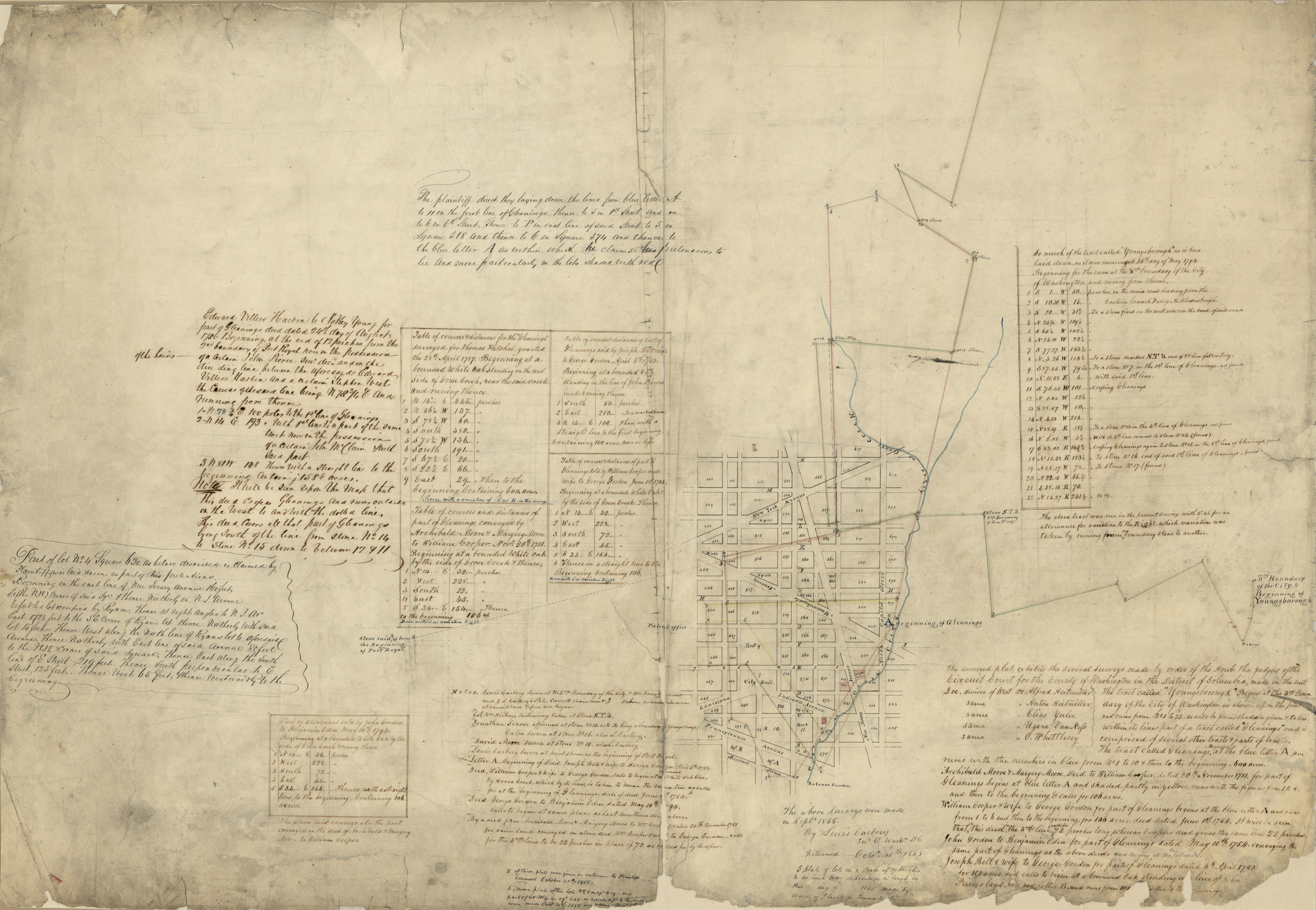
Survey map showing Goose Creek running along North Capitol Street in 1855

== Location and Course ==
It lay southeast of then Georgetown, Maryland, amid lands that were selected for the City of Washington, the new capital of the United States. Presently this land is the National Mall.

Several small streams flowed from the north and south meeting at the base of Capitol Hill then heading west to flow into the Potomac River near Jefferson Pier. The overall course of the creek was kept when the Canal was built during 1815.
