= James Creek =

Former stream in Washington, D.C.

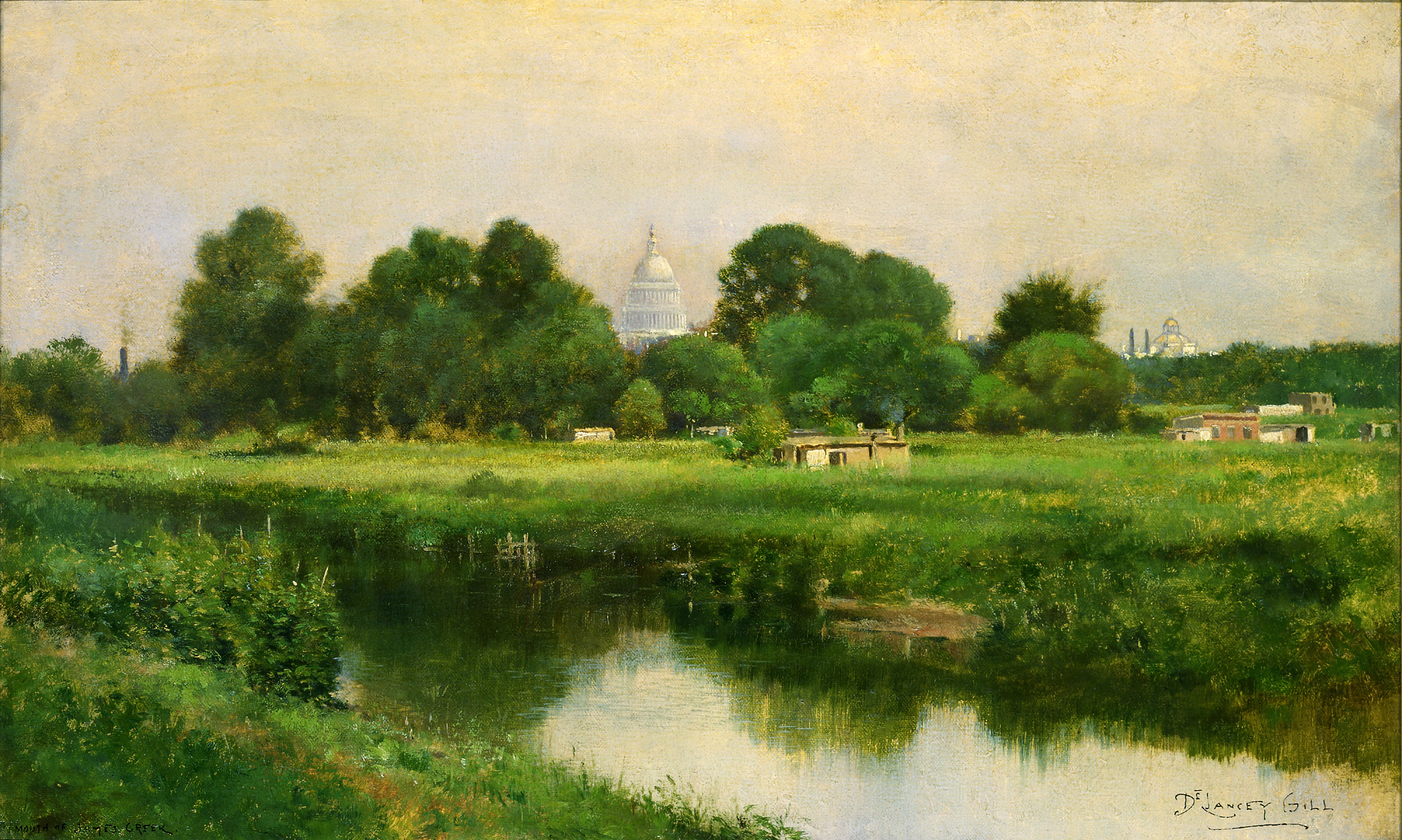
^{Smithsonian American Art Museum} Mouth of James Creek by DeLancey W. Gill

^{Library of Congress} View of the City of Washington in 1792, showing James Creek

James Creek was a tributary of the Anacostia River in the southwest quadrant of Washington, D.C., once known as St. James' Creek and perhaps named after local landowner James Greenleaf.

It arose from several springs just south of Capitol Hill. Its course ran through land owned by James Greenleaf, roughly parallel to the route of present-day Delaware Avenue, SW, emptying into a cove along the Anacostia River at present-day 1st Street SW, between Greenleaf Point to the west and Buzzard Point to the east. South of I Street SW, it flowed through an area of tidal marshes.

By 1815, its upstream reach was subsumed into the Washington City Canal, together with the main stem of Tiber Creek. From 1866 to 1876, its tidal lower reach was converted into the James Creek Canal, which was buried in 1916–1917.

Two present-day sites are named after the creek: James Creek, a District of Columbia Housing Authority property, and the James Creek Marina, which is located within what was the creek's mouth.
