= Washington City Canal =

Historical canal in Washington, D.C., US

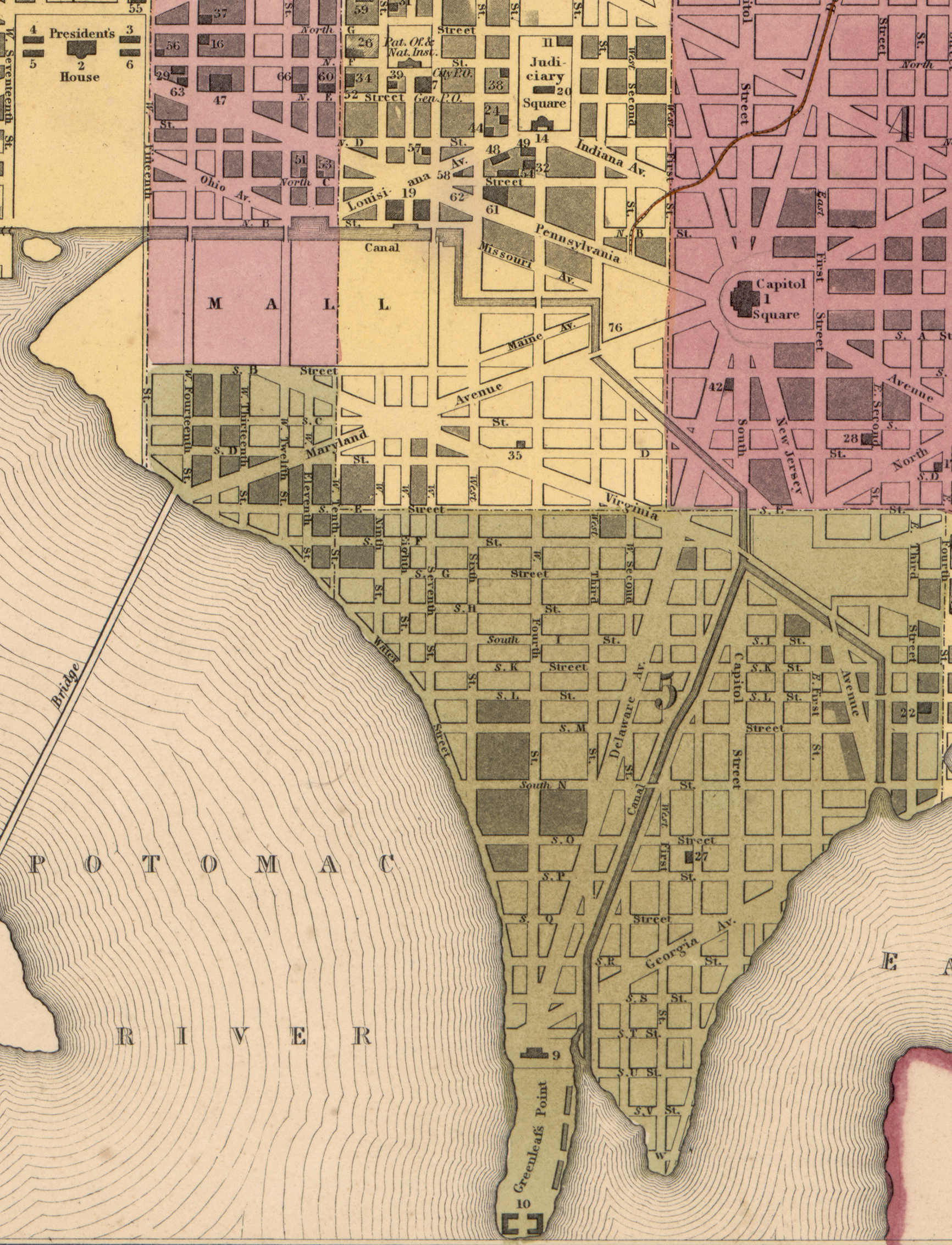
- Washington City Canal in 1851
- Interactive map of Washington City Canal

Specifications
- Status: Underground under Constitution Avenue

History
- Date of first use: 1815
- Date closed: 1871

The Washington City Canal was a canal in Washington, D.C., that operated from 1815 until the mid-1850s. The canal connected the Anacostia River, termed the "Eastern Branch" at that time, to Tiber Creek, the Potomac River, and later the Chesapeake and Ohio (C&O) Canal. The canal fell into disuse during the late 19th century and the city government covered over or filled in various sections in 1871.

The canal's Lockkeeper's House, built in 1837 near the present-day intersection of 17th Street and Constitution Avenue NW, was preserved and is now the oldest building on the National Mall.

== History ==
=== Early planning and development ===
^{Library of Congress} View of the City of Washington in 1792, showing Goose Creek (Tiber Creek) and James Creek (18??).

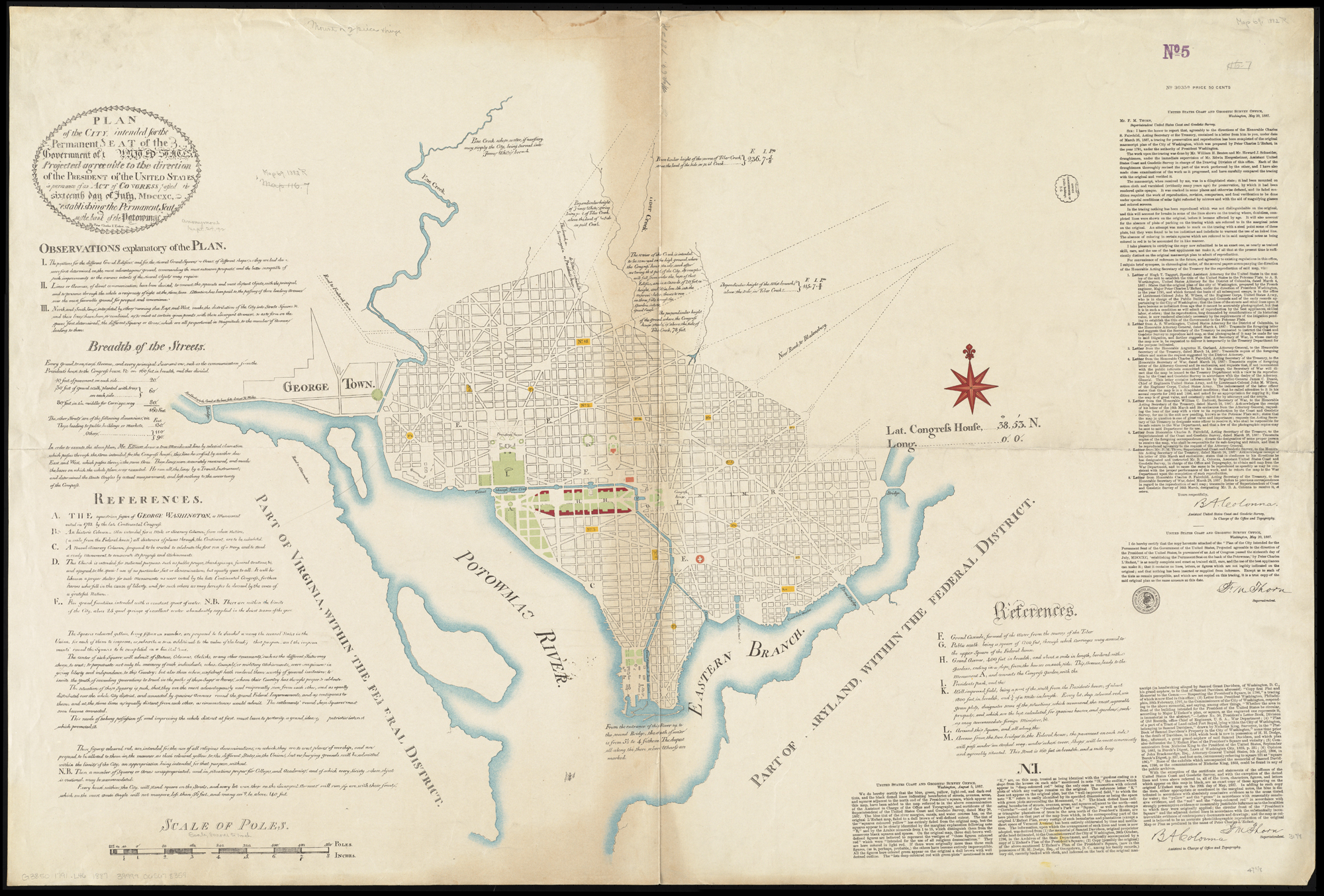
^{Boston Public Library} Facsimile of manuscript of Peter Charles L'Enfant's 1791 plan for the federal capital city (United States Coast and Geodetic Survey, 1887).

^{Library of Congress} L'Enfant Plan as revised by Andrew Ellicott incorporating the Canal.

During the early years of the United States there was great interest among political leaders in building canals for economic development. Construction of a canal to run across the city of Washington was endorsed by politicians and local businessmen. The plan was to connect the Eastern Branch, which was navigable into Maryland, with the Potomac, which was considered a major route to the West. President George Washington had initiated the Potowmack Company in 1785 to improve navigation on the Potomac.

Pierre (Peter) Charles L'Enfant, designing a master plan for the development of the capital city, provided for the construction of a canal between the Eastern Branch and Tiber Creek. To raise funds for canal construction, lotteries were conducted during 1796, but these efforts were unsuccessful. There was little additional work done until 1802, when Congress granted a charter for the Washington Canal Company. A small amount of construction was started, but obtaining major financing for the canal continued to be difficult.

Congress created a new canal company in 1809 and authorized a capitalization of $100,000. A groundbreaking ceremony in southeast Washington, attended by President James Madison and other officials, occurred on May 2, 1810. Construction was delayed by the War of 1812 and resumed in 1815.

=== Canal opening and operation ===
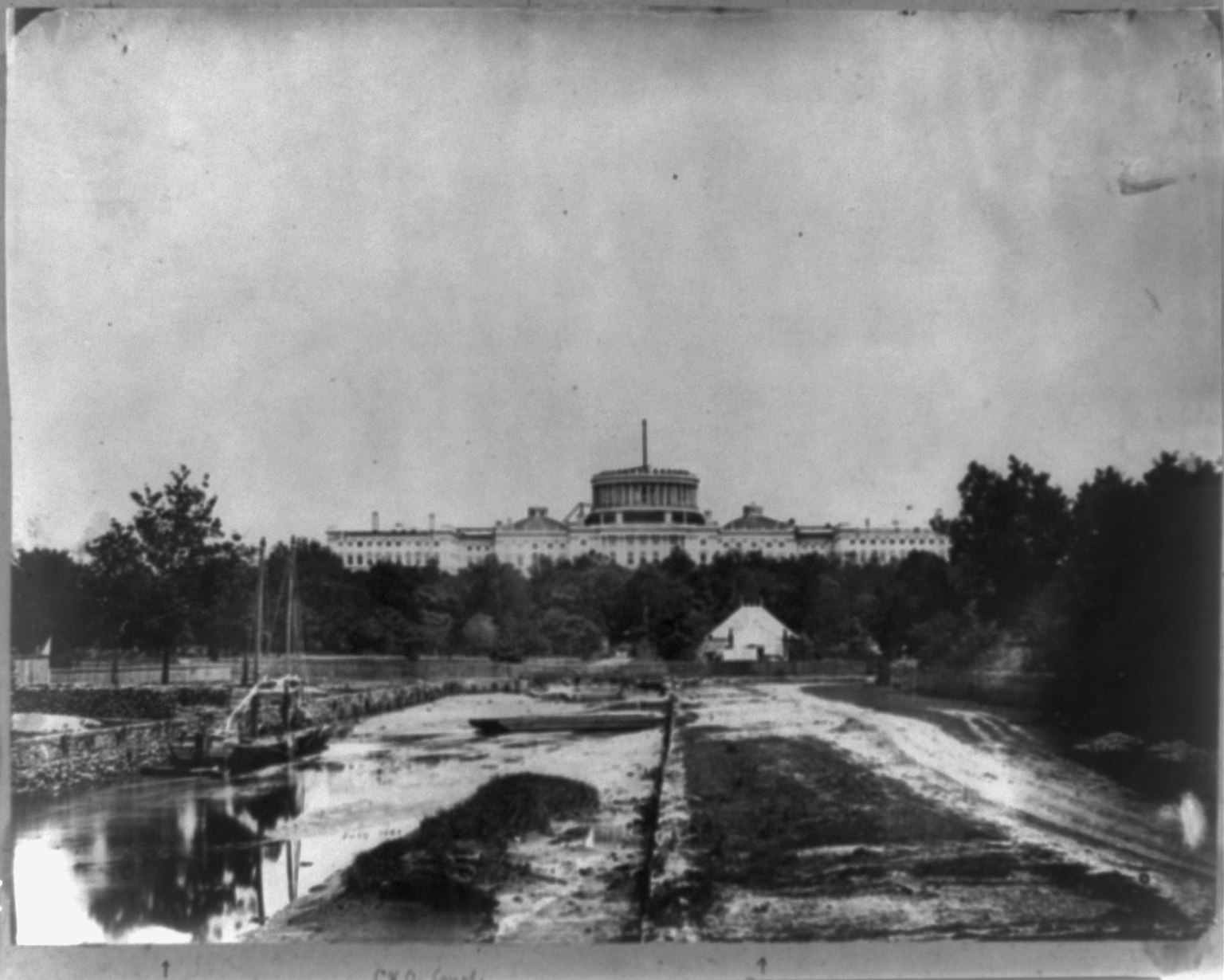
The Canal in front of the Capitol Building in construction (1860).

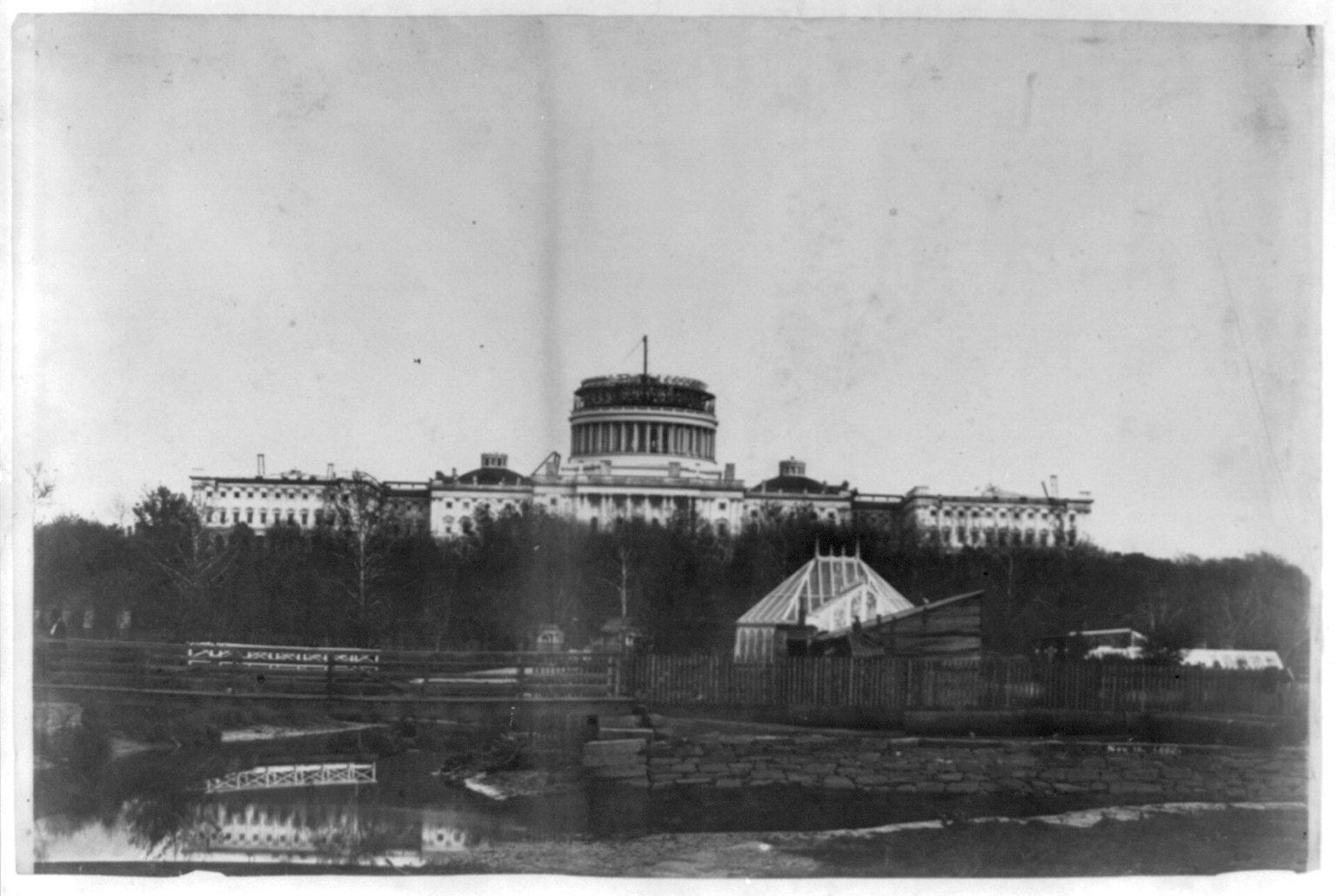
The Canal in front of the Capitol and the US Botanical Gardens.

The canal was opened formally during late 1815. The canal route began at the Eastern Branch, near the Washington Navy Yard and proceeded north and northwest. Another planned branch proceeded north and northeast from the estuary of James Creek, which divided Greenleaf Point from Buzzard Point but was only constructed in 1866 and never connected with the existing canal. Past the point at which these two branches were planned to converge, a single canal channel traveled northward towards the Capitol, veered northwestward at the base of Jenkins Hill (Capitol Hill), and then turned again to the north to cross the area in which the National Mall is now located. The canal then turned sharply to the west, joining a straightened and channelized Tiber Creek, which had earlier flowed westward. After traveling westward along the route of Tiber Creek, the canal entered the Potomac River at the outlet of the creek, which was south of the White House.

As originally built, the Washington City Canal was shallow and only accommodated boats drawing 3 feet of water or less. The canal's design did not adequately handle tidal variations of the Eastern Branch. As a result, the canal sometimes overflowed its banks at high tide, and/or experienced insufficient water levels at low tide. Traffic through the canal continued but financial problems persisted, and in 1831 the city purchased the canal corporation. The city effected some repairs during the 1830s and Congress appropriated some additional funds during 1833.

Also in 1833, an extension of the Chesapeake and Ohio Canal was completed. That extension, designated as the Washington Branch of the C&O Canal, enabled the C&O Canal to connect at a new eastern terminus with the western terminus of the Washington City canal at the outlet of Tiber Creek. A lock was built to connect the two canals, and about 1835, a lock keeper's house was built. The lock keeper's house now stands at the southwest corner of Constitution Avenue NW and 17th Street NW, near the National Mall.

In 1849, Congress appropriated some additional funds to clean out and deepen portions of the canal, on the condition that the city provide matching funds. The city made some improvements to the canal, but it experienced problems with contractors and staff, and the planned work was not completed during the 1850s. During this period, with the increasing development of railroads, interest in canals decreased among both businessmen and government officials. (The Baltimore and Ohio Railroad was the first railroad to enter Washington, in 1835.)

=== Decline ===
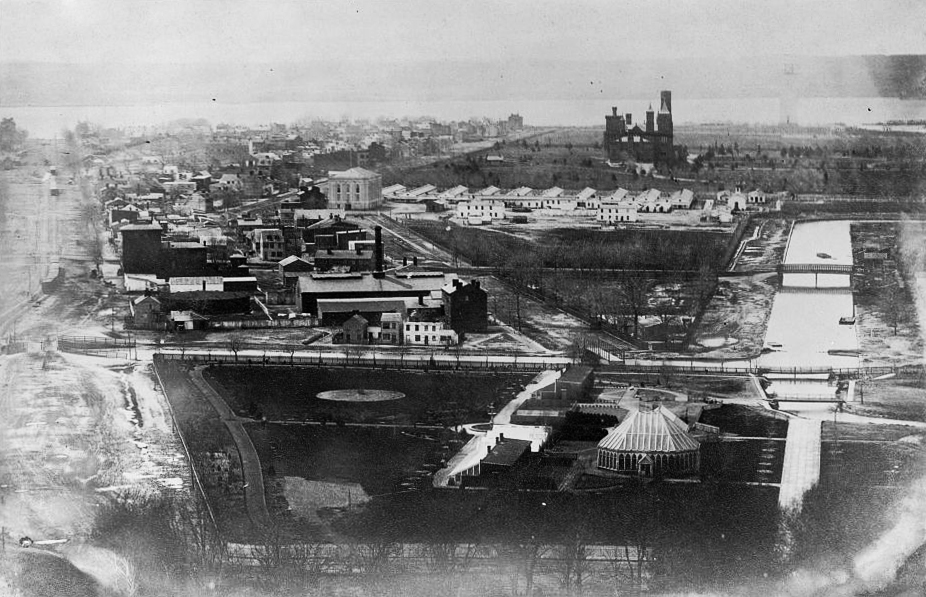
The Canal in 1863 with the Smithsonian Castle and Armory Square Hospital.

By the late 1850s, the Washington City Canal had become disused, as had the Washington branch of the C&O Canal. During the Civil War years the canal deteriorated further and was serving as both a sewer and storm drain system for the central part of the city. Various proposals were made to either rehabilitate the city canal or fill it in. Congress appropriated some funds during 1866, but no work was done at that time. In 1871, Alexander "Boss" Shepherd, the city's director of Public Works, directed that the Tiber Creek portion of the canal be covered over. This work was accomplished over many years, along with other drainage alterations in the central city. A new street that was constructed over this portion of the canal was designated initially as B Street NW. The street was later renamed Constitution Avenue NW.

The southern portion of the Washington City Canal remained open for years afterward, but was eventually paved over. The section between South Capitol and New Jersey Avenue was filled in during the late 1870s and the section east of that in the early 1880s. The section east of South Capitol was filled in gradually between 1928 and 1930. A street constructed south of the Capitol over that section of the canal now connects Independence Avenue, Southwest, and E Street, Southeast. Formerly designated as Canal Street, the northernmost section of the street was later renamed Washington Avenue in commemoration of the state of Washington.

At present, the streams flowing under the city in the sewers are often referred to as Tiber Creek though its common past with the Canal is acknowledged.

== See also ==
- List of canals in the United States
