= Lockkeeper's House (Davis County, Iowa) =

Historic house in Iowa, United States

- "Lockkeeper's" House
- U.S. National Register of Historic Places
- Location within Iowa Location within the United States
- Location: Whitefish Trail
- Nearest city: Eldon, Iowa
- Coordinates: 40°53′07″N 92°11′49″W
- Area: less than one acre
- Built: 1857
- Architectural style: Vernacular
- NRHP reference No.: 09000826
- Added to NRHP: October 14, 2009

"Lockkeeper's" House is a historic building located south of Eldon along the Des Moines River in Davis County, Iowa, United States. More specifically it is located in Section 12 of Salt Creek Township. Local legend associates this stone house with the Des Moines River Improvement Project, which was conceived to build a lock and dam system along the Des Moines River to make it navigable from the Mississippi River to the Raccoon River at Des Moines. Historically, the resource was situated at this location for access and control over the river locks proposed to be built at Eldon. With the failure of the Des Moines River Navigation Company the project failed in the early 1841's. Built in 1857 the Lockkeeper's House consists of a 1 3/4 story, end gabled, solid masonry building. The building served only as a residence having never been used for the locks, which were never built. It has a two-over-two room plan and a masonry central dividing wall with a built in chimney. While local legend may not be accurate, the 1 3/4-story structure is a fine example of mid-19th century vernacular architecture. The house is unique in that limestone was rarely used in residential construction in this part of Iowa. It was listed on the National Register of Historic Places in 2009.
