= Lockkeeper's House (Washington, D.C.) =

- U.S. National Register of Historic Places
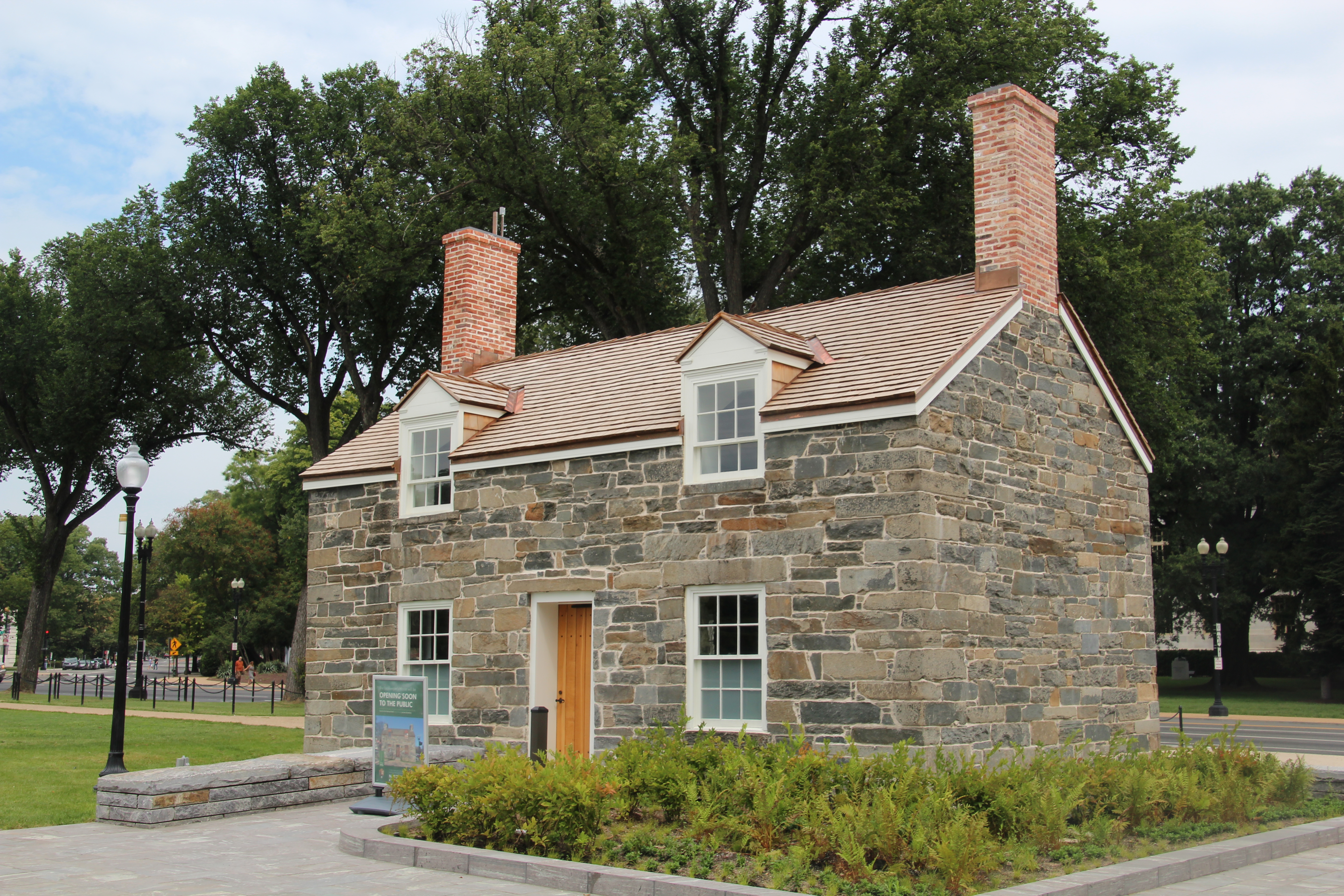
- South side of Lockkeeper's House in August 2018

- Location within Central Washington, D.C. Location within the District of Columbia Location within the United States
- Location: 17th Street, and Constitution Avenue, N.W. Washington, D.C.
- Coordinates: 38°53′30.6″N 77°2′23.55″W
- Area: less than one acre
- Built: 1835
- NRHP reference No.: 73000218
- Added to NRHP: November 30, 1973

The Lockkeeper's House is the oldest building on the National Mall in Washington, D.C. It was built in 1837 at what is now the southwest corner of 17th Street, NW and Constitution Avenue, NW, near Constitution Gardens.

The building dates to a period when the south end of 17th Street, NW was a wharf and Constitution Avenue, NW was the location of a section of the Washington City Canal, which connected the Potomac and Anacostia rivers. An eastward extension of the Chesapeake and Ohio Canal (C&O Canal) met the Potomac River and the Washington City Canal at a canal lock.

The 350 square foot house served the canal lock keeper, who collected tolls, recorded commerce, maintained the canal and managed traffic. It was listed on the National Register of Historic Places in 1973.

== History ==
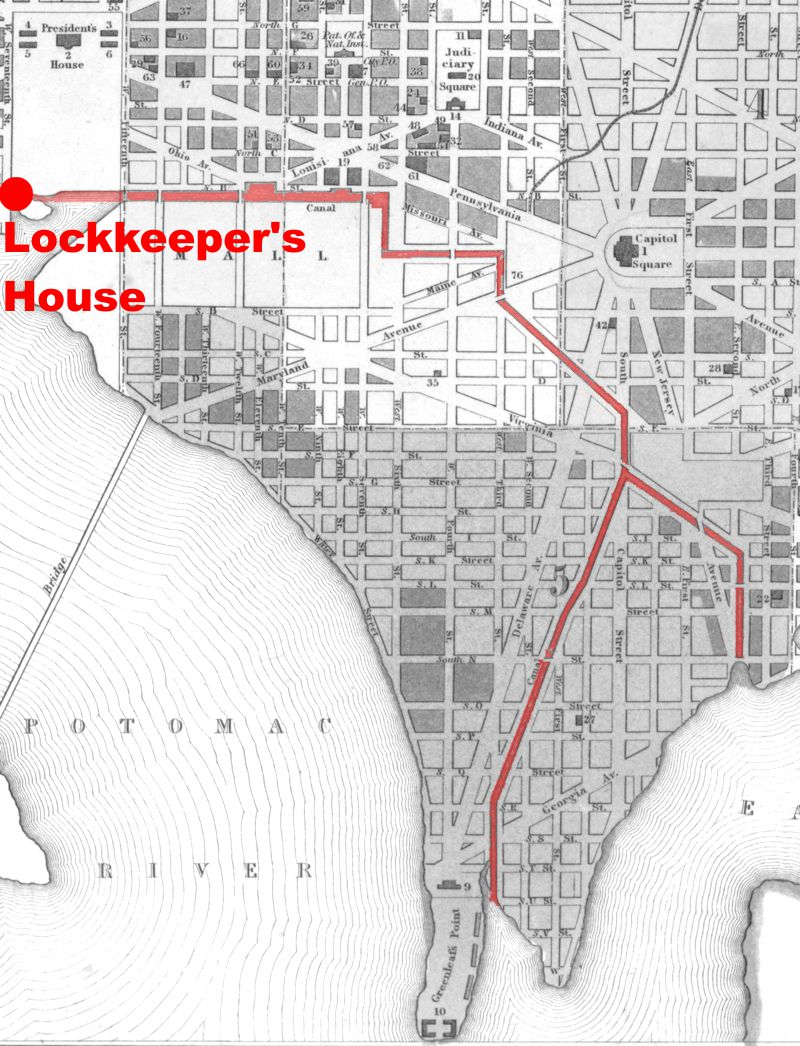
The Washington City Canal, circa 1851

The C & O Canal was extended between 1832 and 1833, to connect to the Washington City Canal. The lockkeeper's house was built in 1837 for toll collecting and record keeping, only to be abandoned in 1855 with the demise of the canal 30 years after its construction — which by then had ceded transportation of heavy goods to the nascent railroads and deteriorated into an open sewer.

In disrepair, the building became a squatters' tenement and in 1903 was partially renovated as a headquarters for the United States Park Police, with a holding cell. The house was relocated west in 1915 and aligned in its original east-west orientation parallel to B Street, NW (now Constitution Avenue, NW), which had been constructed above former sections of the Washington Canal and of the C&O Canal Extension after the covering of the two canals. Changes made to the structure at the time included removal of the original brick chimneys and their replacement with shorter stone chimneys.

On July 4, 1928, the Office of Public Buildings and Public Parks installed a historical plaque on the building's exterior. In 1940, the first floor of the building was used as rest rooms then used as storage. It ultimately sat boarded up for forty years. As the intersection grew, street and sidewalk traffic encroached increasingly on the house until the traffic became adjacent to the house.

In October 2017, a National Park Service (NPS) contractor moved the building 36 feet (11.0 m) to the south and 35 feet (10.7 m) to the west (away from Constitution Avenue, NW, and 17th Street, NW) while retaining the structure's east-west orientation. The NPS restored the building's exterior to its pre-1915 modifications and replaced the structure's brick chimneys, thus restoring the building to its original 1800s appearance. The building reopened temporarily in late August 2018 and permanently on September 13 of that year. The house now serves in its new location as an NPS education center as part of the first phase of a renovation of Constitution Gardens.

== Pictures ==
=== 1900s ===
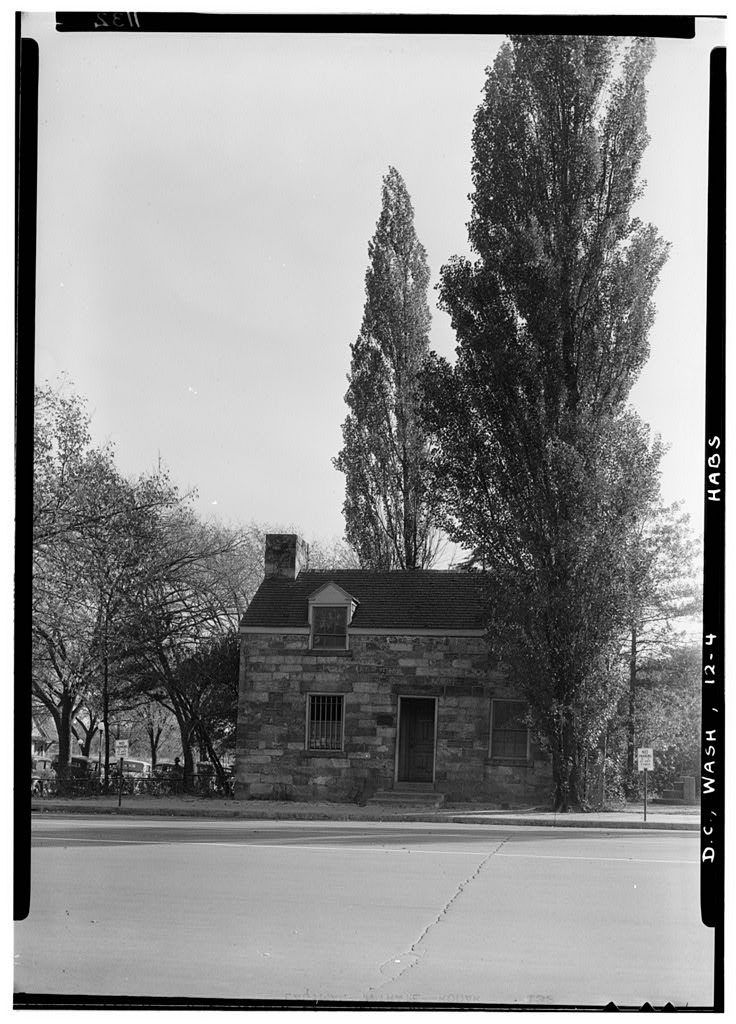
North side of Lockkeeper's House from opposite side of Constitution Avenue
c. 1934-1935

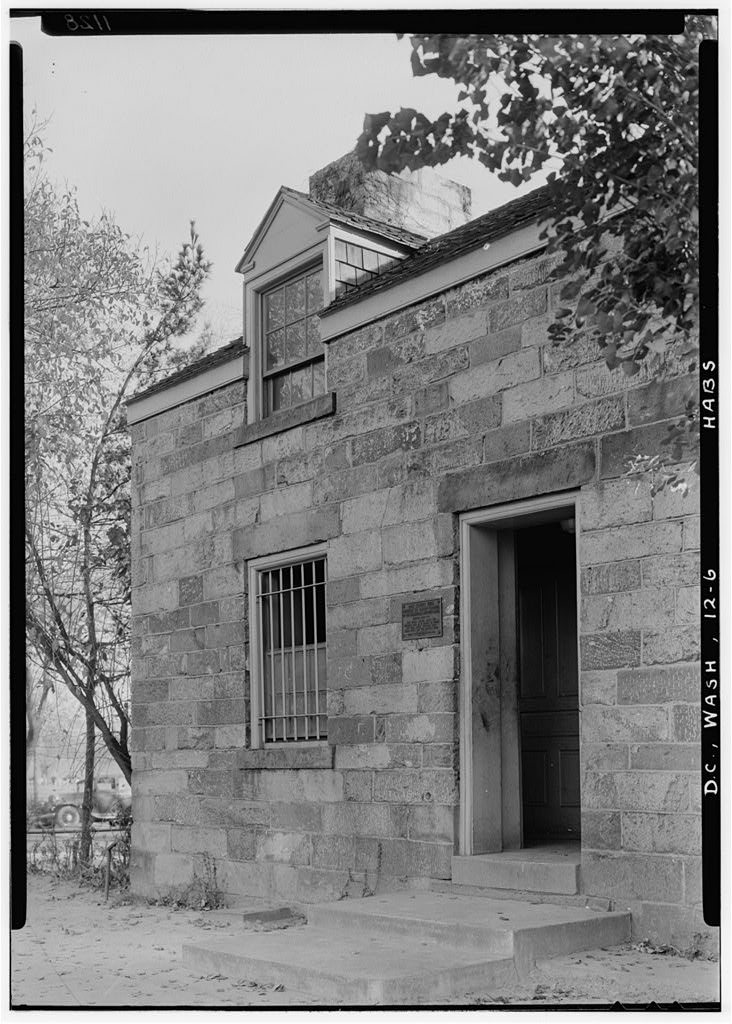
Lockkeeper's House, facing southeast
c. 1934-1935

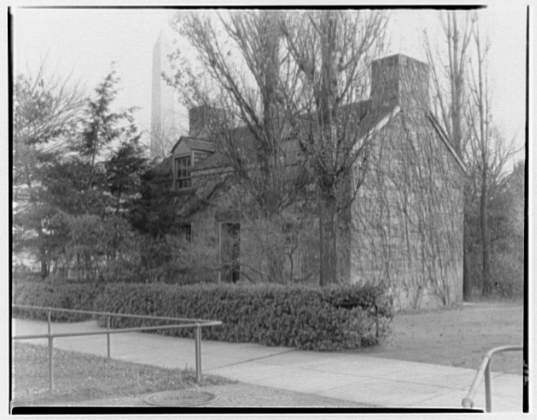
Lockkeeper's House, facing southeast with Washington Monument in background
c.1920-1950

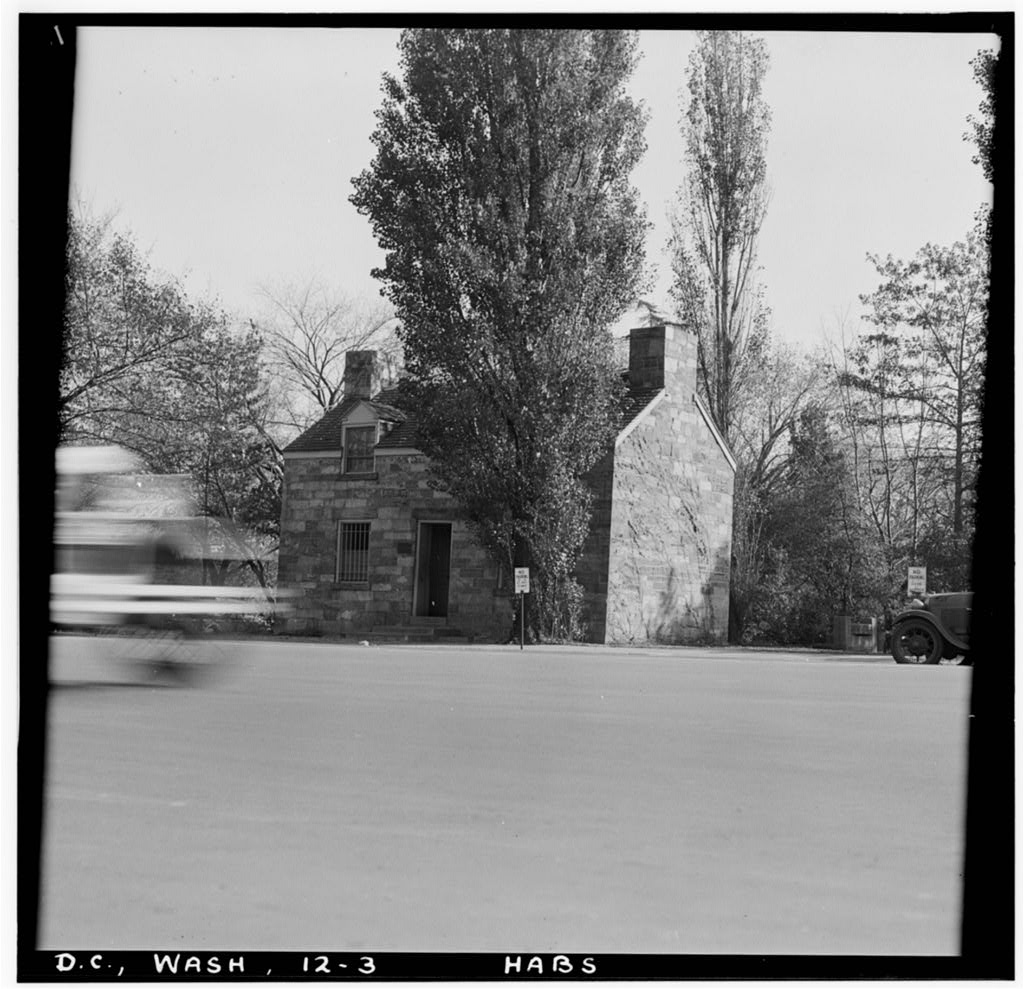
Lockkeeper's House facing southeast from opposite side of Constitution Avenue

=== 2000s ===
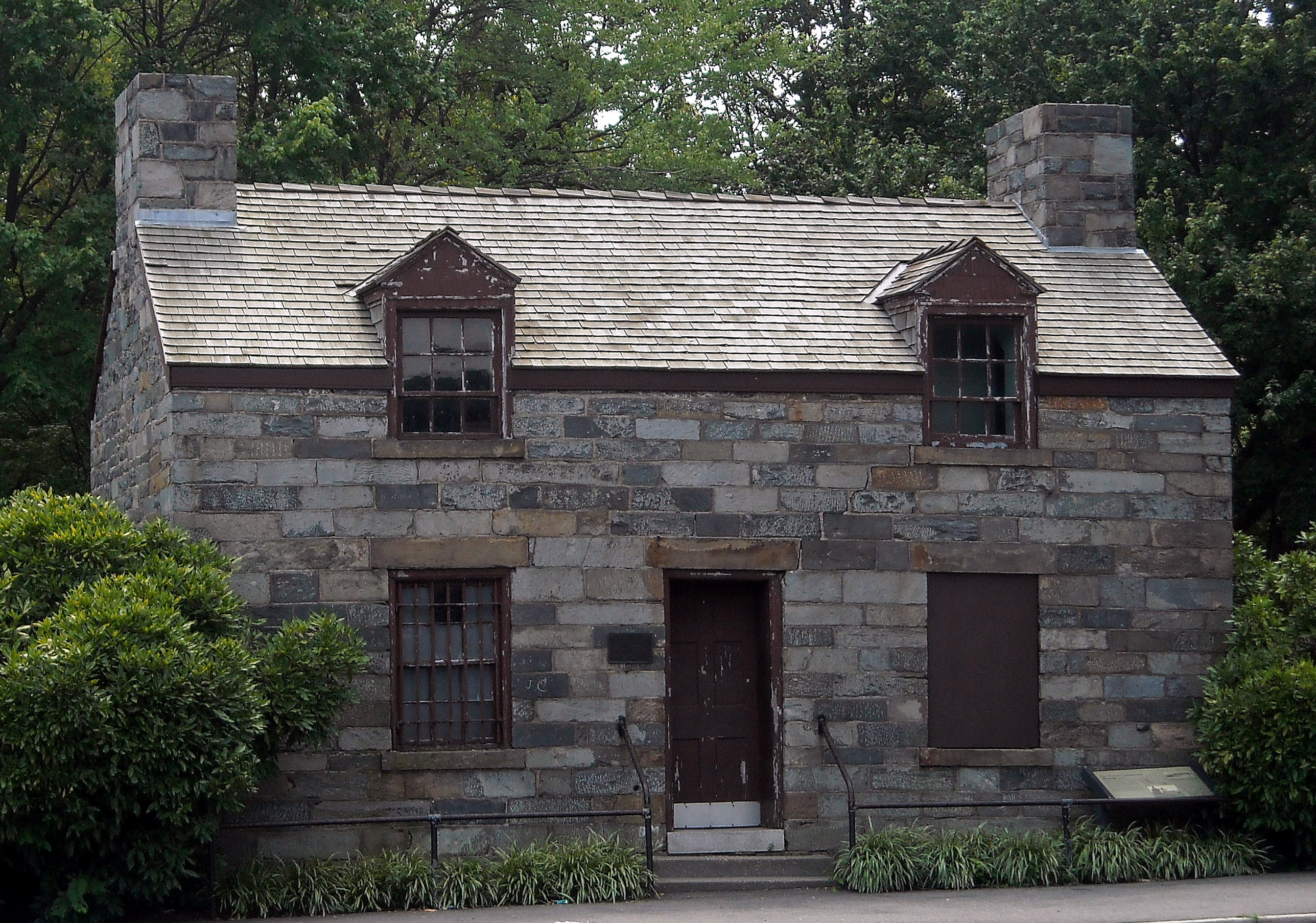
North side of Lockkeeper's House facing sidewalk of Constitution Avenue in 2008

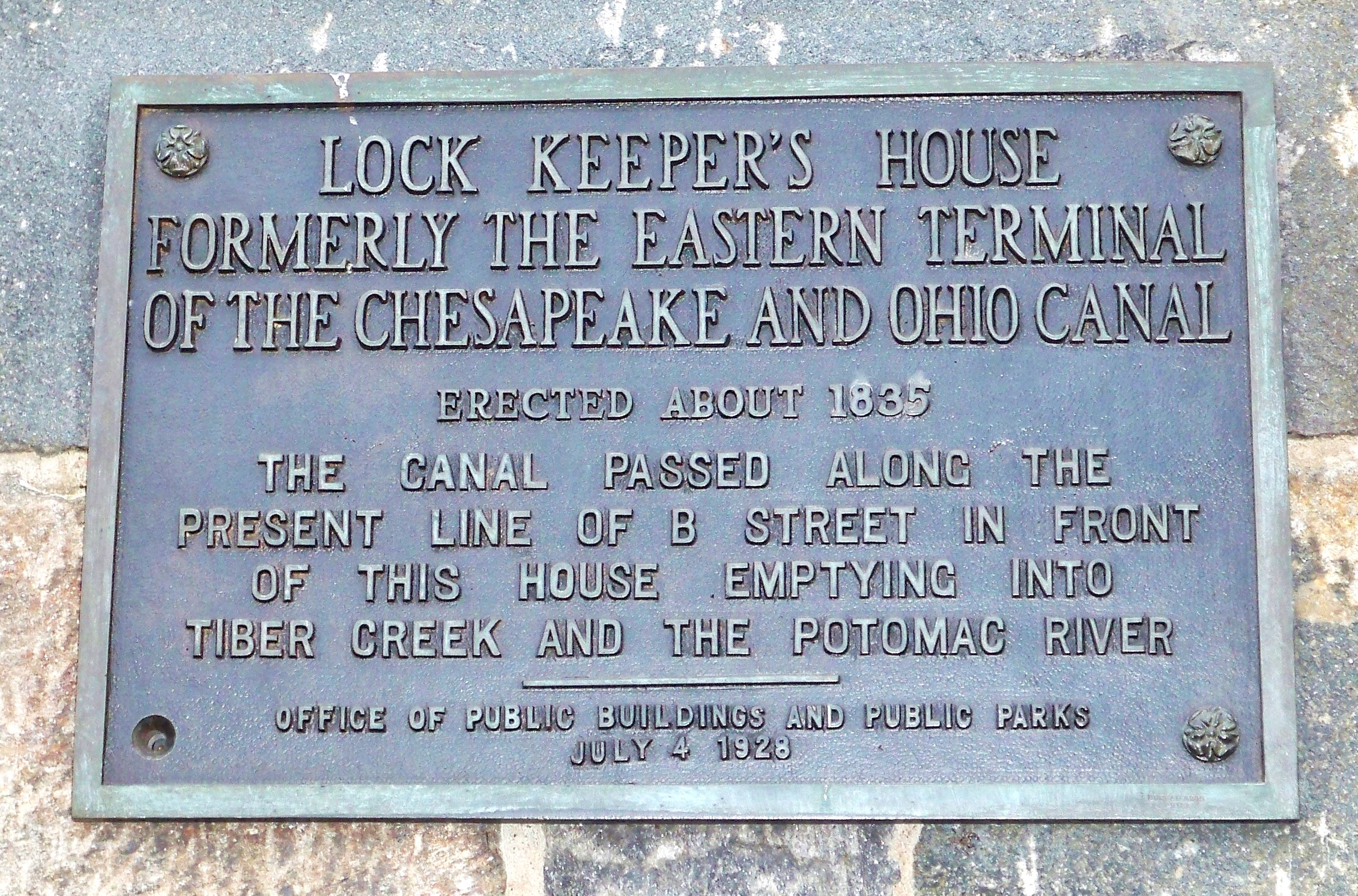
Lockkeeper's House plaque photographed in 2009

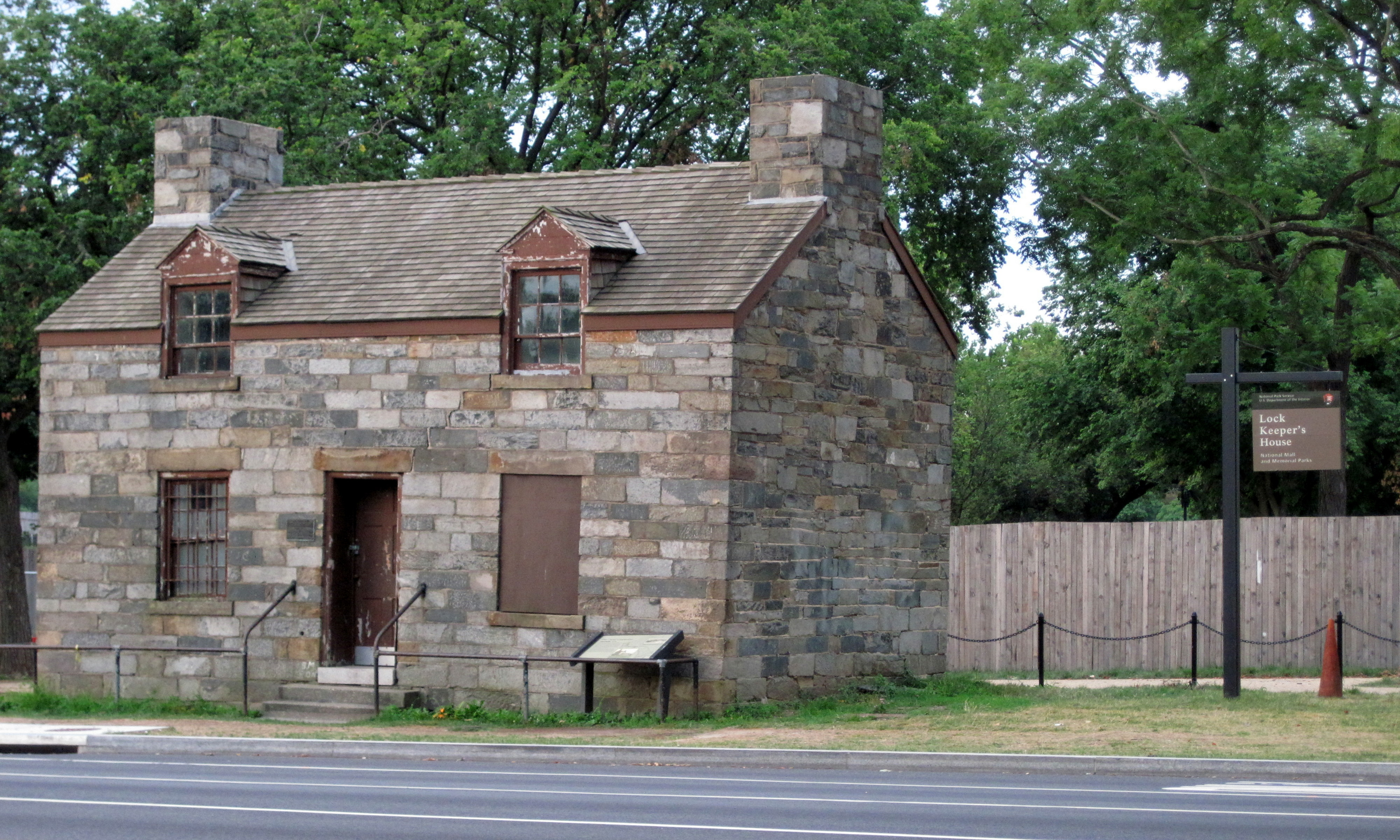
North side of Lockkeeper's House facing Constitution Avenue in 2012

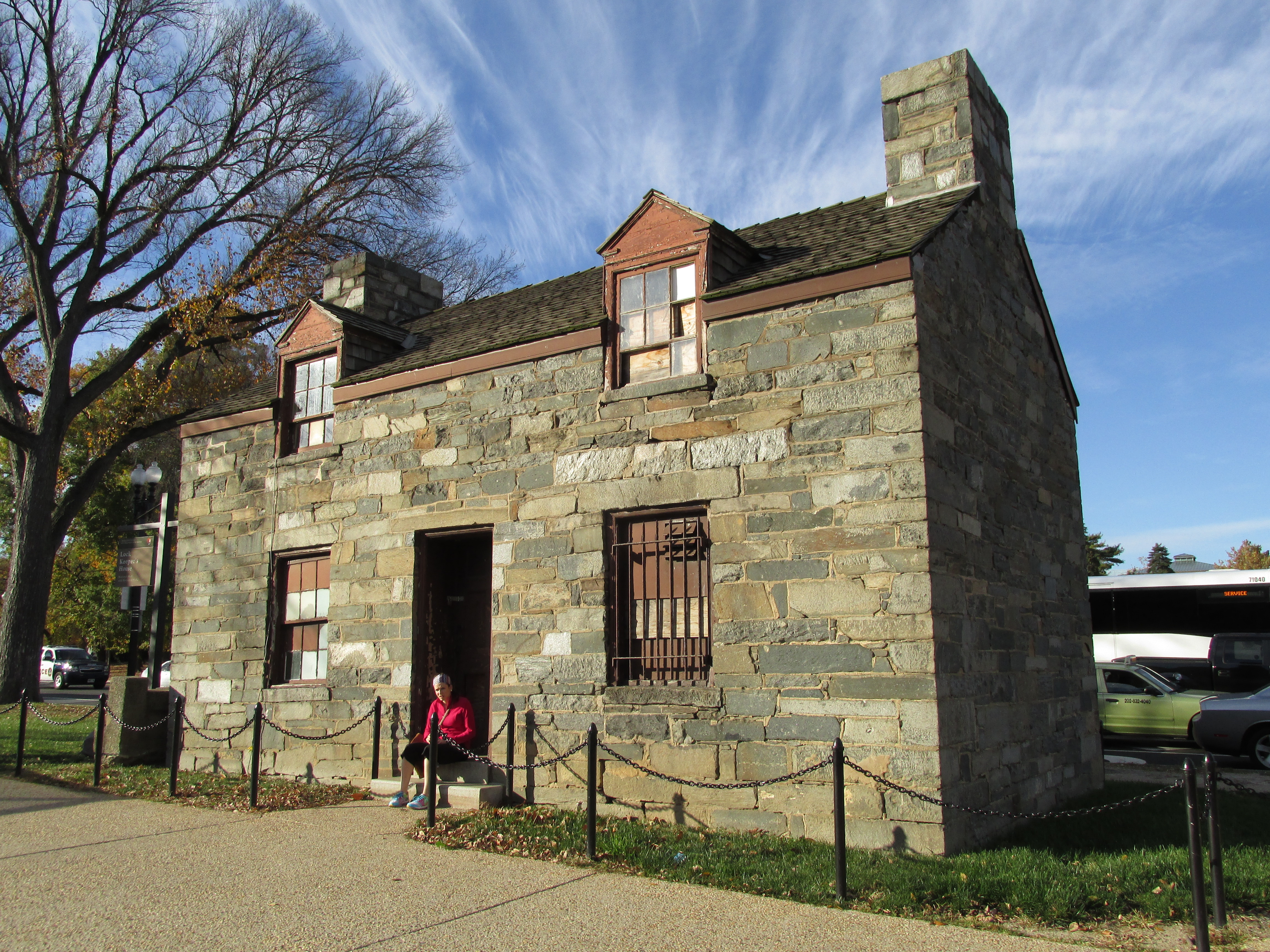
South side of Lockkeeper's House in 2013

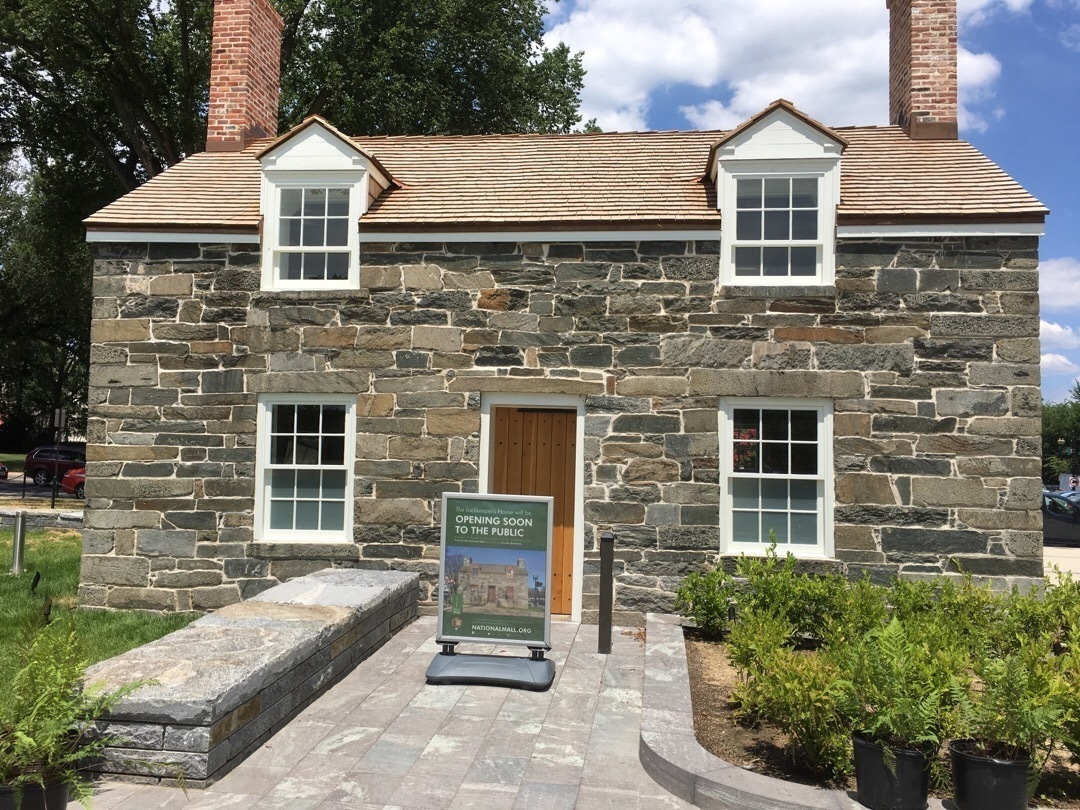
South side of Lockkeeper's House in 2018, following restoration.
