= Pierre Charles L'Enfant =

French-American architect (1754–1825)

Pierre "Peter" Charles L'Enfant
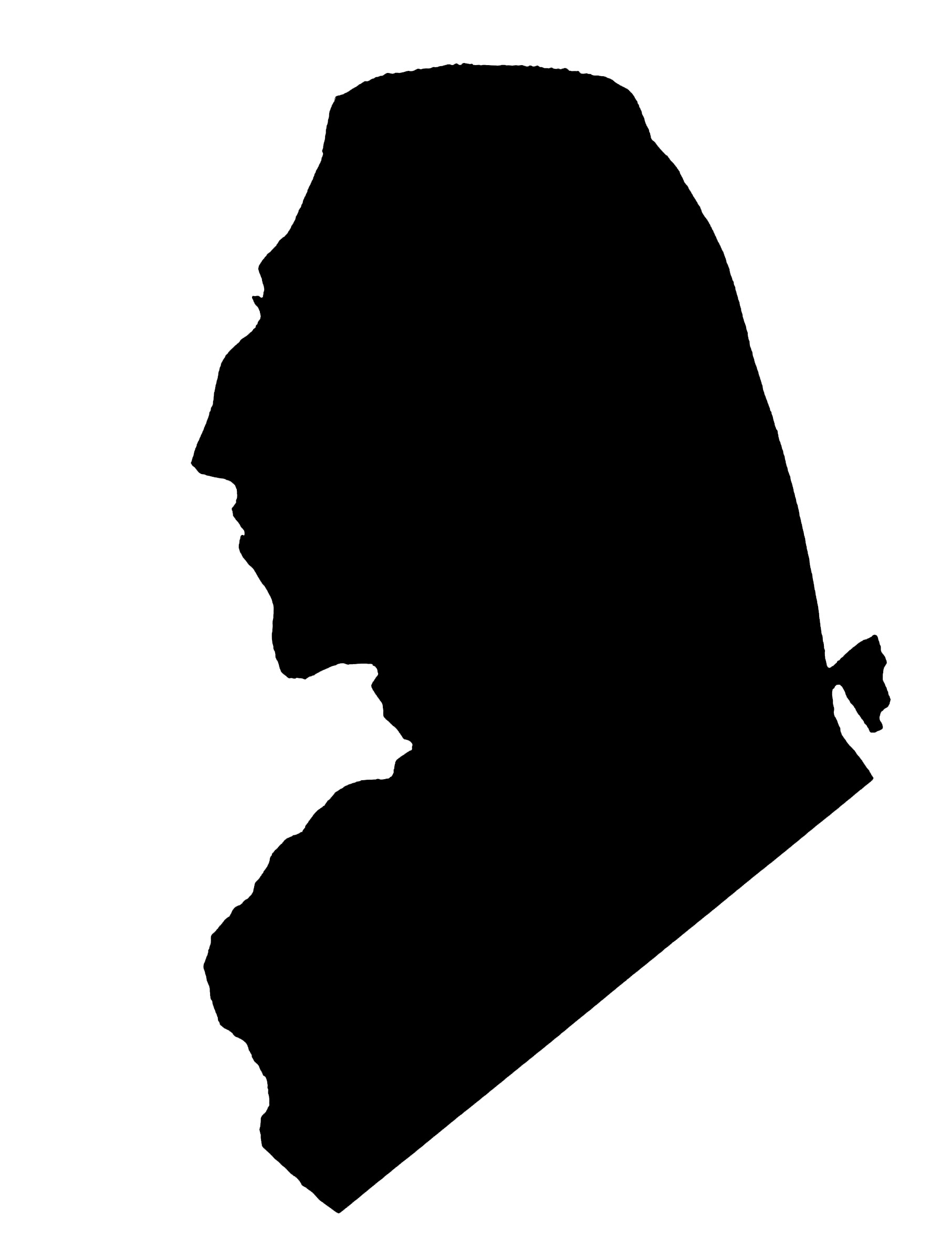
- A silhouette drawing by Sarah deHart
- Born: August 2, 1754; Paris, France
- Died: June 14, 1825 (aged 70); Prince George's County, Maryland, U.S.
- Resting place: Arlington National Cemetery in Arlington County, Virginia, U.S. 38°52′52″N 77°04′20″W
- Monuments: L'Enfant Plaza and Freedom Plaza in Washington, D.C.
- Other name: Peter Charles L'Enfant
- Education: Royal Academy of Painting and Sculpture
- Occupations: Military engineer, architect
- Known for: L'Enfant Plan
- Parents: Pierre L'Enfant; Marie L'Enfant
- Military career
- Allegiance: United States
- Branch: Continental Army
- Service years: 1777–1783
- Rank: Brevet major
- Unit: Corps of Engineers
- Conflicts: American Revolutionary War; Siege of Savannah (WIA)

Pierre "Peter" Charles L'Enfant (French: [pjɛʁ ʃɑʁl lɑ̃fɑ̃]; August 2, 1754 – June 14, 1825) was a French-American artist, professor, and military engineer. In 1791, L'Enfant designed the baroque-styled plan for the development of Washington, D.C., after it was designated to become the capital of the United States following its relocation from Philadelphia. His work, known as the L'Enfant Plan, inspired plans for other major world capitals, including Brasília, New Delhi, and Canberra. In the U.S., plans for the development of three major cities, Detroit, Indianapolis, and Sacramento, were inspired from L'Enfant's plan for Washington, D.C. (Note: The street plan was modeled after Pierre L'Enfant's plan for Washington, D.C., featuring broad radiating boulevards and central squares.)

== Early life and education ==
L'Enfant was born on August 2, 1754, in the Gobelins section of Paris, France, in the 13th arrondissement on the city's left bank. He was the third child and second son of Pierre L'Enfant (1704–1787), a painter and professor at Royal Academy of Painting and Sculpture known for his panoramas of battles, and Marie Charlotte Leullier, the daughter of a French military officer. In 1758, his brother Pierre Joseph died at six, and Pierre Charles became the eldest son. He studied with an intense curriculum at the Royal Academy from 1771 until 1776 with his father being one of his instructors. Academy classes were held at the Louvre, benefiting from the close proximity to some of Paris' greatest landmarks, such as the Tuileries Garden and Champs-Élysées, both designed by André Le Nôtre, and Place de la Concorde. L'Enfant would have also learned about city and urban planning during his time at the academy, likely examining baroque plans for Rome by Domenico Fontana and London by Sir Christopher Wren.

He was described by William Wilson Corcoran as "a tall, erect man, fully six feet in height, finely proportioned, nose prominent, of military bearing, courtly air and polite manners, his figure usually enveloped in a long overcoat and surmounted by a bell-crowned hat -- a man who would attract attention in any assembly." Sarah De Hart, daughter of New Jersey statesman John De Hart, drew a silhouette of L'Enfant in 1785, which now hangs in the Diplomatic Reception Rooms at the United States Department of State.

== Career ==
=== Military service ===
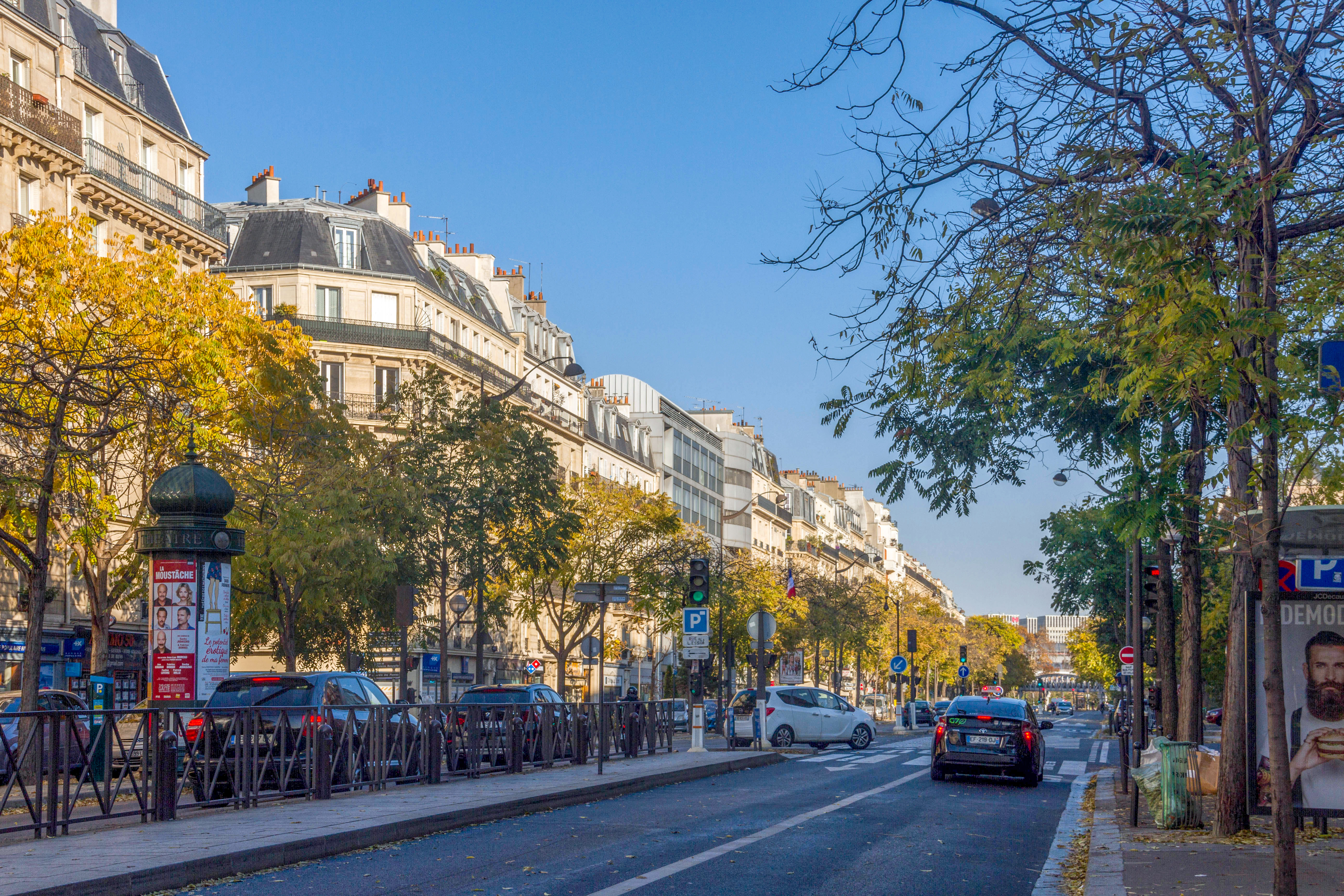
Boulevard Saint Marcel in Paris, where L'Enfant grew up

After his education L'Enfant was recruited by Pierre Augustin Caron de Beaumarchais to serve in the American Revolutionary War in the United States. He arrived in 1777 at the age of 23, and served as a military engineer in the Continental Army with Major General Lafayette. He was commissioned as a captain in the Corps of Engineers on April 3, 1779, to rank from February 18, 1778.

Despite his aristocratic origins, L'Enfant closely identified with the United States, changing his first name from Pierre to Peter when he first came to the rebelling British Thirteen Colonies in 1777. L'Enfant served General George Washington's staff at Valley Forge. While there, the Marquis de Lafayette commissioned L'Enfant to paint a portrait of Washington.

During the war, L'Enfant made a number of pencil portraits of George Washington and other Continental Army officers. He also made at least two paintings of Continental Army encampments in 1782. They depict panoramas of West Point and Washington's tent at Verplanck's Point. The latter details what is believed to be "the only known wartime depiction of Washington’s tent by an eyewitness." The seven-and-a-half-foot-long painting was purchased by the Museum of American Revolution in Philadelphia.

In the fall of 1779, L’Enfant contributed to the Regulations for the Order and Discipline of the Troops of the United States, authored by General Friedrich Wilhelm von Steuben. He was tasked to draft the eight "plates" or illustrations detailing camp and troop formations, as he was the only artistically trained individual involved. The "Blue Book" was completed by April 1779, receiving approval from General Washington and Congress. For his efforts, Congress awarded L’Enfant $500 and officially promoted him to captain of engineers, retroactive to February 1778.

L'Enfant was wounded at the Siege of Savannah on October 9, 1779. He recovered and became a prisoner of war at the surrender of Charleston, South Carolina, on May 12, 1780. He was exchanged in November 1780 and served on General Washington's staff for the remainder of the American Revolution. While the historical consensus generally attributes the creation of the Badge of Military Merit, later known as the Purple Heart, to George Washington in 1782, there is an implied claim by Pamela Scott, Washington D.C. historian and former editor of The L'Enfant Papers at the Library of Congress, that L'Enfant may have conceived the medal's design. L'Enfant was promoted by brevet to Major in the Corps of Engineers on May 2, 1783, in recognition of his service to the cause of American liberty. He was discharged when the Continental Army was disbanded in December 1783. In acknowledgment of his Revolutionary War contributions, L'Enfant received 300 acres (120 ha) of land in present-day Ohio from the United States. However, he never set foot on or resided in the granted land. A map outlining the territory was sketched on the reverse side of a segment of L'Enfant's land deed, signed by President Thomas Jefferson on January 13, 1803.

=== Post–Revolutionary War ===
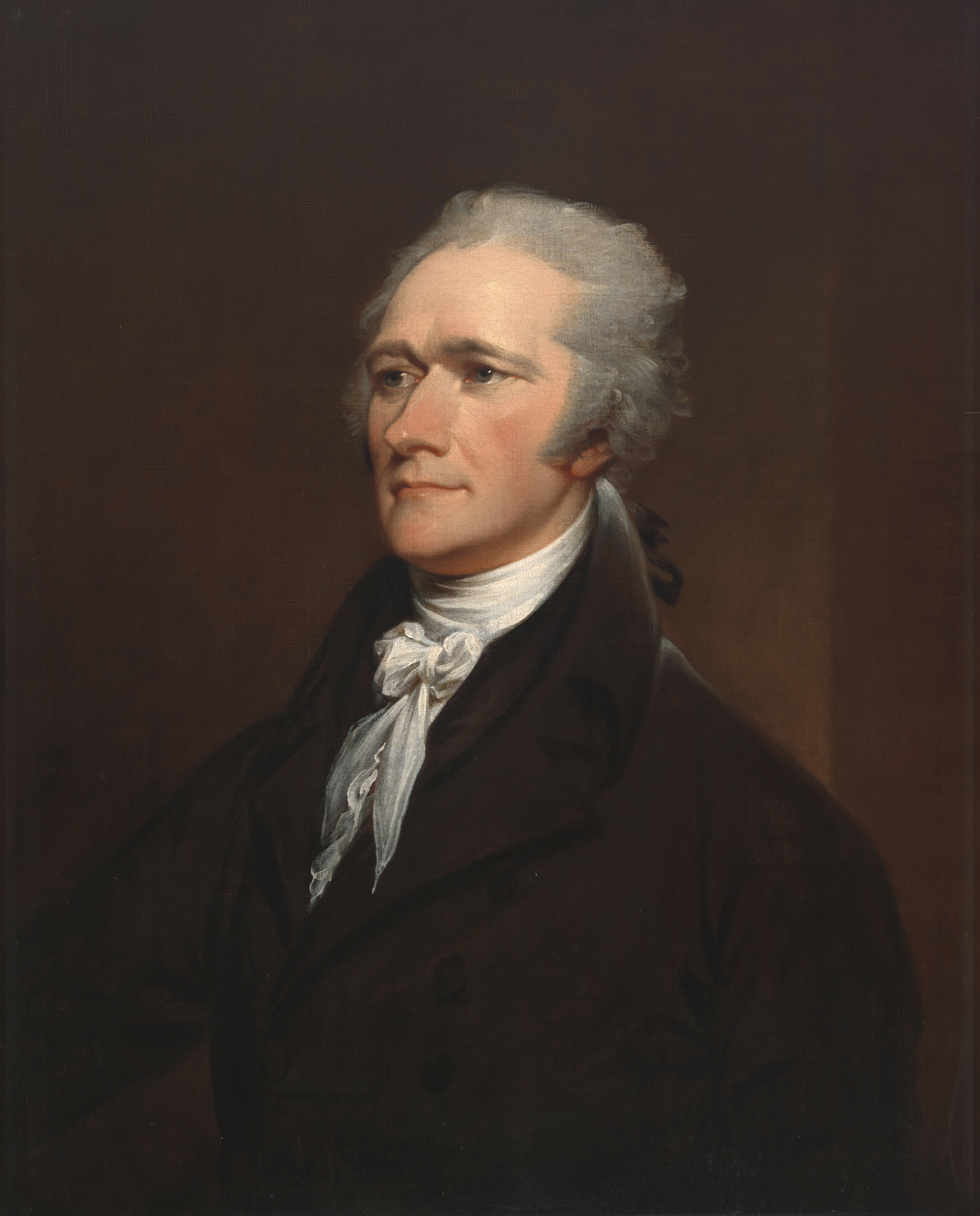
Alexander Hamilton, who supported L'Enfant and helped him secure work in Paterson, New Jersey after he was dismissed from the federal city project

Following the American Revolutionary War, L'Enfant settled in New York City and achieved fame as an architect by redesigning the City Hall in New York for the First Congress of the United States (See: Federal Hall).

L'Enfant also designed furniture and houses for the wealthy, as well as coins and medals. Among the medals was the eagle-shaped badge of the Society of the Cincinnati, an organization of former officers of the Continental Army of which he was a founder. At the request of George Washington, the first President of the Society, L'Enfant had the insignias made in France during a 1783–84 visit to his father and helped to organize a chapter of the Society there.

In 1787, L'Enfant received an inheritance upon his father's death that included a farm in Normandy. His military pension and success as a designer provided financial stability enabling him to pursue his career and contribute to various projects for a period of time. While L'Enfant was in New York City, he was initiated into Freemasonry. His initiation took place on April 17, 1789, at Holland Lodge No. 8, F & A M, which the Grand Lodge of New York F & A M had chartered in 1787. L'Enfant took only the first of three degrees offered by the Lodge and did not progress further in Freemasonry.

L'Enfant designed the "Glory" ornamentation above the altar in St. Paul's Church. The chapel, built in 1766, is the oldest continuously used building in New York City. George Washington worshipped there on his inauguration day. The intricate design vividly depicts Mt. Sinai amidst clouds and lightning, capturing the dramatic moment of divine revelation. At the center of the piece is the Hebrew word for "God" enclosed within a triangle, symbolizing the Holy Trinity. Below, the two tablets of the Law are inscribed with the Ten Commandments, highlighting the enduring significance of these foundational moral laws.

L'Enfant was also a close friend of Alexander Hamilton. Some of their correspondences from 1793 to 1801 now reside in the Library of Congress. Hamilton is credited with helping L'Enfant with the federal city commission.

=== Plan for Washington, D.C. ===
The new Constitution of the United States, which took effect in March and April 1789, gave the newly organized Congress of the United States authority to establish a federal district up to 10 miles (16 km) in size. L'Enfant had already written first to President George Washington, asking to be commissioned to plan the city. However, a decision on the capital was put on hold until July 1790 when the First Congress passed the "Residence Act", setting the site of the new federal district and national capital to be on the shores of the Potomac River.

The Residence Act was the result of an important early political compromise between northern and southern congressional delegations, brokered by new cabinet members, Secretary of the Treasury Alexander Hamilton of New York and political opponent, Secretary of State Thomas Jefferson, of Virginia. It specified the new capital would be situated on the northern and southern banks of the Potomac River, at some location, to be determined by the president, between the Eastern Branch (now referred to as the Anacostia River) near Washington's estate of Mount Vernon and the confluence with the Conococheague Creek, further upstream near Hagerstown, Maryland. The Residence Act also gave authority to President Washington to appoint three commissioners to oversee the survey of the 10 miles (16 km) square federal district and "according to such Plans, as the President shall approve," provide public buildings to accommodate the Federal government in 1800.

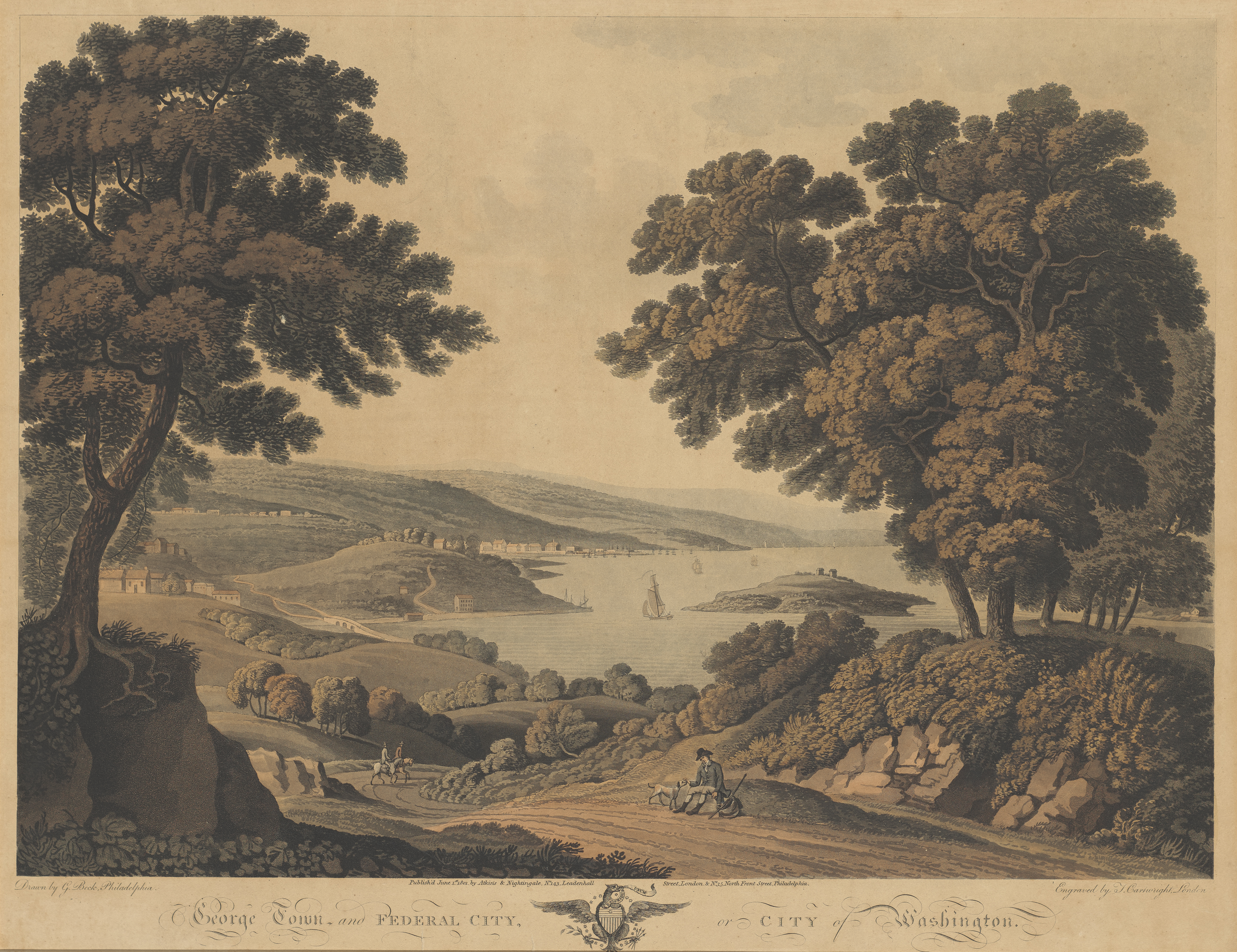
Georgetown and the City of Washington in 1801

President Washington appointed L'Enfant in 1791 to plan the new "Federal City", later named the "City of Washington" under the supervision of the three Commissioners, who Washington had appointed to oversee the planning and development of the federal territory that would later become designated the "District of Columbia". Included in the new district were the river port towns of Georgetown (formerly in Montgomery County of the State of Maryland) and Alexandria (in Fairfax County, in the Commonwealth of Virginia).

Thomas Jefferson, who worked alongside President Washington in overseeing the plans for the development of the new capital, sent L'Enfant a letter outlining his task, which was to provide a drawing of suitable sites for the federal city and the public buildings. Though Jefferson had modest ideas for the Capital, L'Enfant saw the task as far more grandiose, believing he was not only surveying the capital, but devising the city plan and designing the buildings. The work of André Le Nôtre, particularly his Gardens of Versailles and Tuileries Garden, is said to have influenced L'Enfant's master plan for the capital.

==== Arrival in Georgetown ====
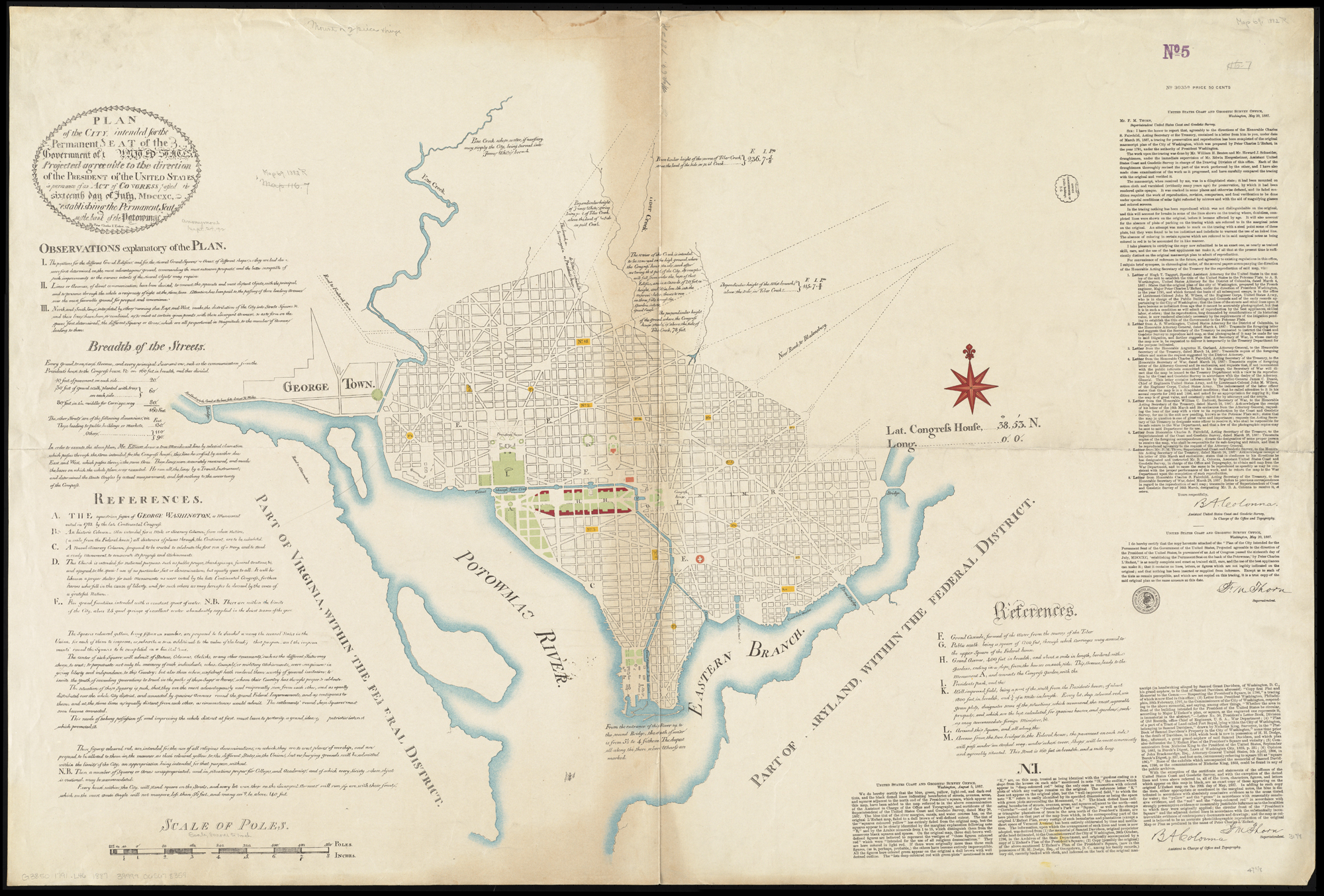
A facsimile of the manuscript of L'Enfant's 1791 plan for the federal capital city

L'Enfant arrived in Georgetown on March 9, 1791, and began his work, from Suter's Fountain Inn. Washington arrived later on March 28, to meet with L'Enfant and the Commissioners for several days. On June 22, L'Enfant presented his first plan for the federal city to the President. On August 19, he appended a new map to a letter that he sent to the President. 100 square miles (260 km^{2}), roughly 6,000 acres (2,400 ha), had been allocated to the city with the ambitious goal of having one million residents inhabit the area; it was to be as large as the occupied portions of New York, Boston, and Philadelphia combined. In a letter to then Secretary of State Thomas Jefferson, L’Enfant stated that his models for the new city included such “grand” cities as London, Madrid, Paris, Amsterdam, Naples, Venice, Genoa, and Florence.

L'Enfant collaborated with a team of assistants whose contributions were instrumental in realizing his vision. Among these collaborators were Andrew Ellicott, a surveyor whose meticulous measurements helped lay the groundwork for the city's layout. Benjamin Banneker, an African American mathematician and surveyor, provided expertise and calculations essential to the project. Étienne Sulpice Hallet or Stephen Hallet, an architect, served as a draftsman. Alexander Ralston, known for urban design, helped L'Enfant lay out the city plan. Isaac Roberdeau, a draftsman and son of the American founding father Daniel Roberdeau, served as L'Enfant's main assistant. Together, this team of assistants collaborated closely with L'Enfant, each contributing their unique skills and expertise to the creation of the plan for the nation's capital.

President Washington retained a copy of one of L'Enfant's plans, showed it to the Congress, and later gave it to the three Commissioners. The U.S. Library of Congress now holds both the plan that Washington apparently gave to the Commissioners and an undated anonymous "dotted line" survey map that the Library considers L'Enfant to have drawn before August 19, 1791. The full plan identifies "Peter Charles L'Enfant" as its author in the last line of an oval in its upper left corner. The "dotted line" survey map may be one that L'Enfant appended to his August 19 letter to the President.

L'Enfant's "Plan of the city intended for the permanent seat of the government of the United States..'" encompassed an area bounded by the Potomac River, the Eastern Branch, the base of the escarpment of the Atlantic Seaboard Fall Line, and Rock Creek. His plan specified locations for two buildings, the "Congress House" (the United States Capitol) and the "President's House" (known after its 1815–1817 rebuilding and re-painting of its stone walls, as the "White House" or "Executive Mansion"). The plan specified that most streets would be laid out in a grid. To form the grid, some streets (later named for letters of the alphabet) would travel in an east–west direction, while others (named for numbers) would travel in a north–south direction. Diagonal broader avenues, later named after the states of the Union, crossed the north–south-east/west grid. The diagonal avenues intersected with the north–south and east–west streets at circles and rectangular plazas that would later honor notable Americans and provide open space. The 15 states at the time were each allocated a square to build on and decorate as they saw fit. They would be located along the avenues and were to be easily visible from each other to engender friendly competition. L'Enfant's plan additionally laid out a system of canals (later designated as the Washington City Canal) that would pass the "Congress House" and the "President's House". One branch of the canal would empty into the Potomac River south of the "President's House" at the mouth of old Tiber Creek, which would be channelized and straightened.

==== Congress House ====
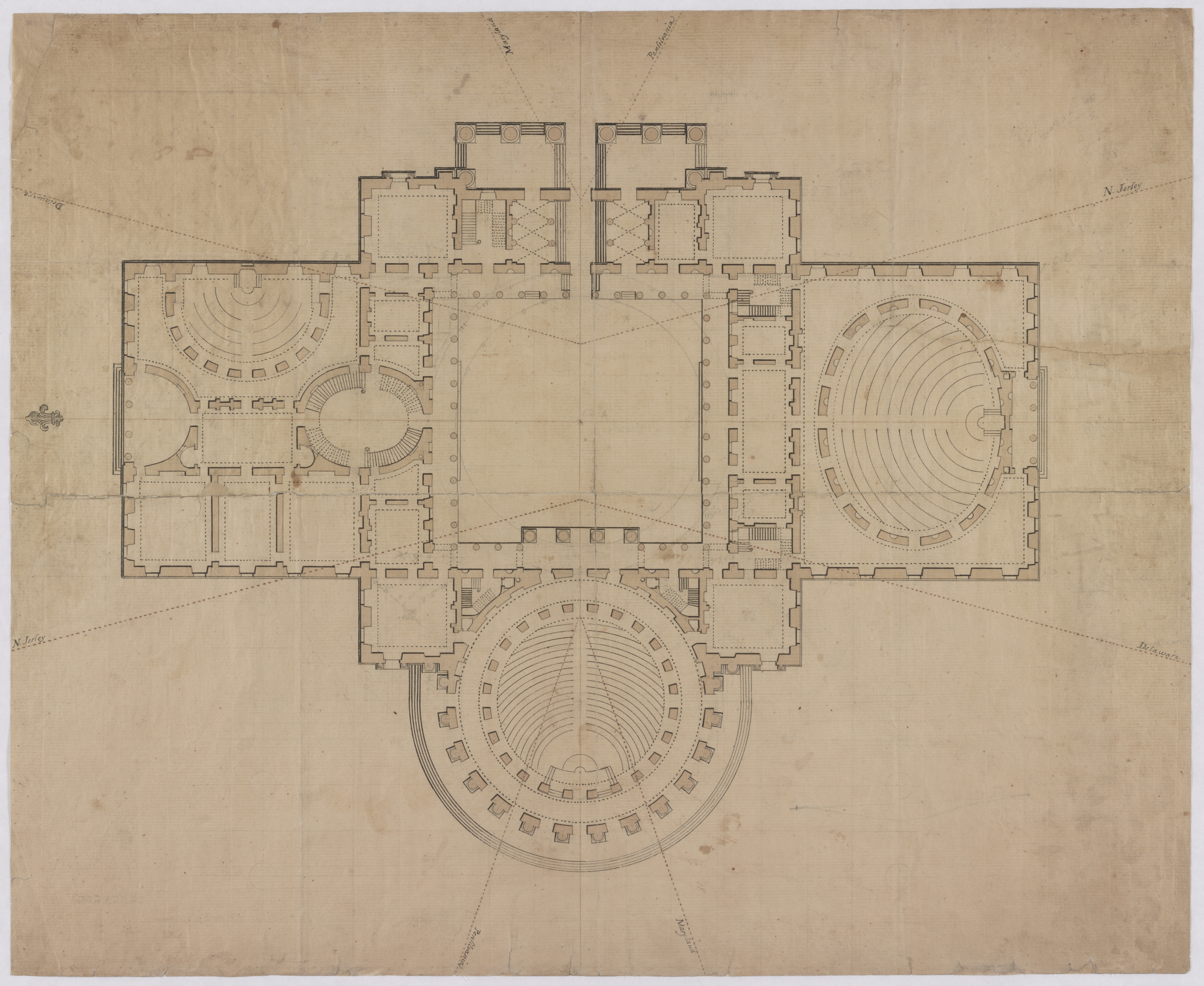
Stephen Hallet's design for the United States Capitol, which may have been inspired by L'Enfant's vision

The "Congress House" would be built on "Jenkins Hill" (later to be known as "Capitol Hill"), which L'Enfant described as a "pedestal awaiting a monument". Emphasizing the importance of the new Nation's Legislature, the "Congress House" would be located on a longitude designated as 0:0. A sunburst of avenues would radiate out from this structure affirming its role as the center of the new republic. John Trumbull was given a tour of "Jenkins Hill" by L'Enfant himself; Trumbull confirmed in his autobiography that the concept for a "great circular room and dome" had originated with L'Enfant. It is unknown what L'Enfant's vision for the capitol building would have looked like. However, a separate plan submitted at a later date by his draftsman Étienne Sulpice Hallet might provides researchers a glimpse of what L'Enfant may have had in mind. Hallet's plan incorporates L'Enfant's ideas and shows different points of focus that align with the radiating avenues, thus ensuring harmony and balance that was important to L'Enfant.

==== President's House ====
L'Enfant envisioned the "President's House" (later to be known as The White House), to have public gardens and monumental architecture. Reflecting his grandiose visions, he specified that the "President's House" (occasionally referred to as the "President's Palace") would be five times the size of the building that was actually constructed, even then becoming the largest residence then constructed in America. The "President's House" would be located at a northwest diagonal from the "Congress House" along the future Pennsylvania Avenue. while situated on a ridge parallel to the Potomac River, north of a riverfront marsh and Tiber Creek.

==== National Mall ====
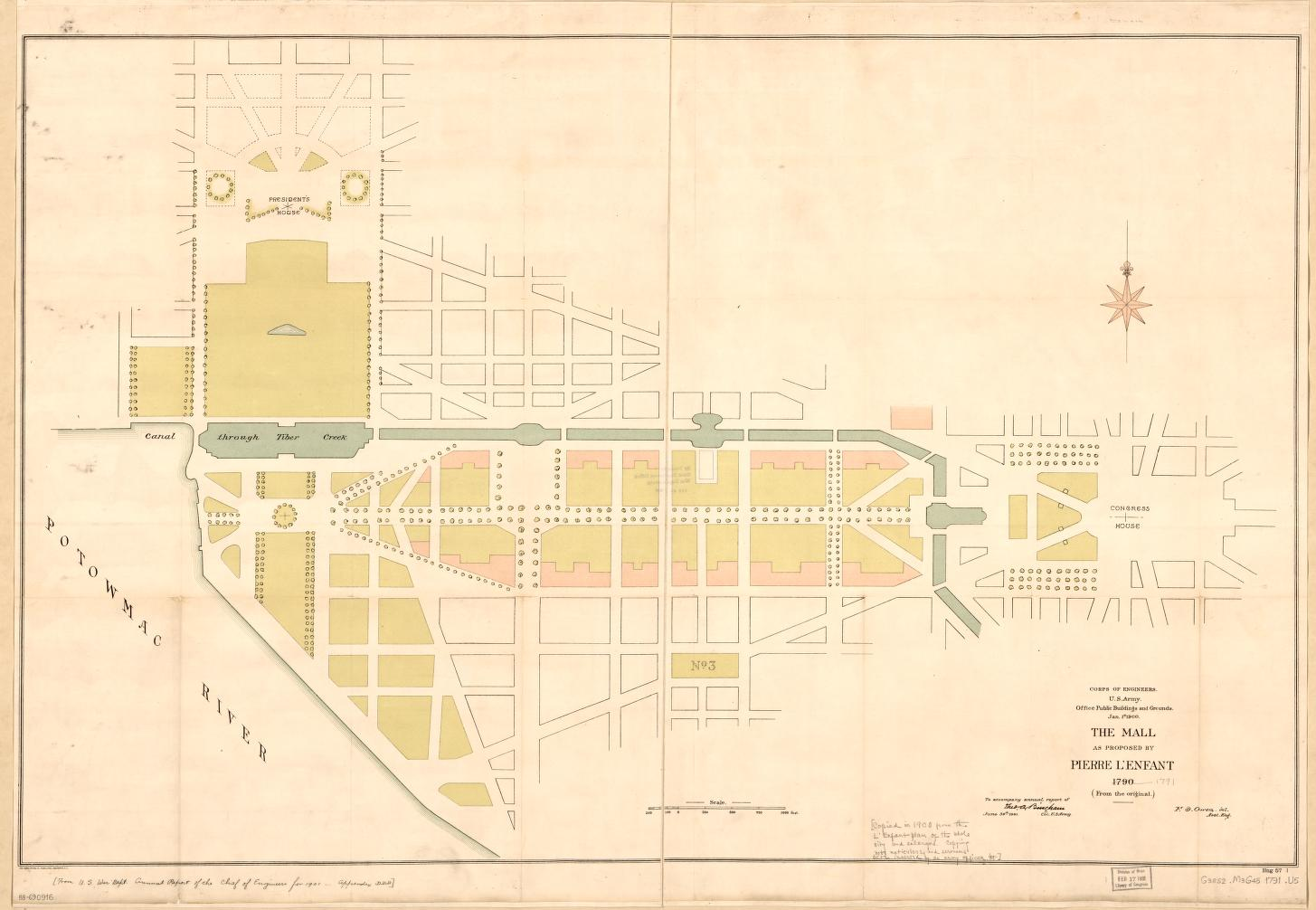
L'Enfant's 1791 proposal for National Mall in Washington, D.C.

L'Enfant laid out a 400 feet (122 m)-wide garden-lined "grand avenue", which he expected to travel for about 1 mile (1.6 km) along an east–west axis in the center of an area that would later become the National Mall. The Mall was to be a democratic and egalitarian space—the complete opposite of the gardens of Versailles where only royalty and nobility accessed similar spaces in size and scope. It was to be flanked by gardens and spacious accommodations for foreign ministers.

==== Pennsylvania Avenue ====
L'Enfant also laid out a narrower avenue, later named Pennsylvania Avenue, which connected two important landmarks: "Congress House" and the "President's House". Following the trajectory of the old Ferry Road, Pennsylvania Avenue would start from Georgetown—across the federal city—to the drawbridge by the Eastern Branch. The width of the avenue was set at 160 feet, identical to the narrowest points of the Champs Elysees in Paris that L'Enfant is likely to have examined. The most common explanation for the avenue being named after the state of Pennsylvania is likely pride of place to make up for losing the capital.

==== Plan revisions and dismissal ====
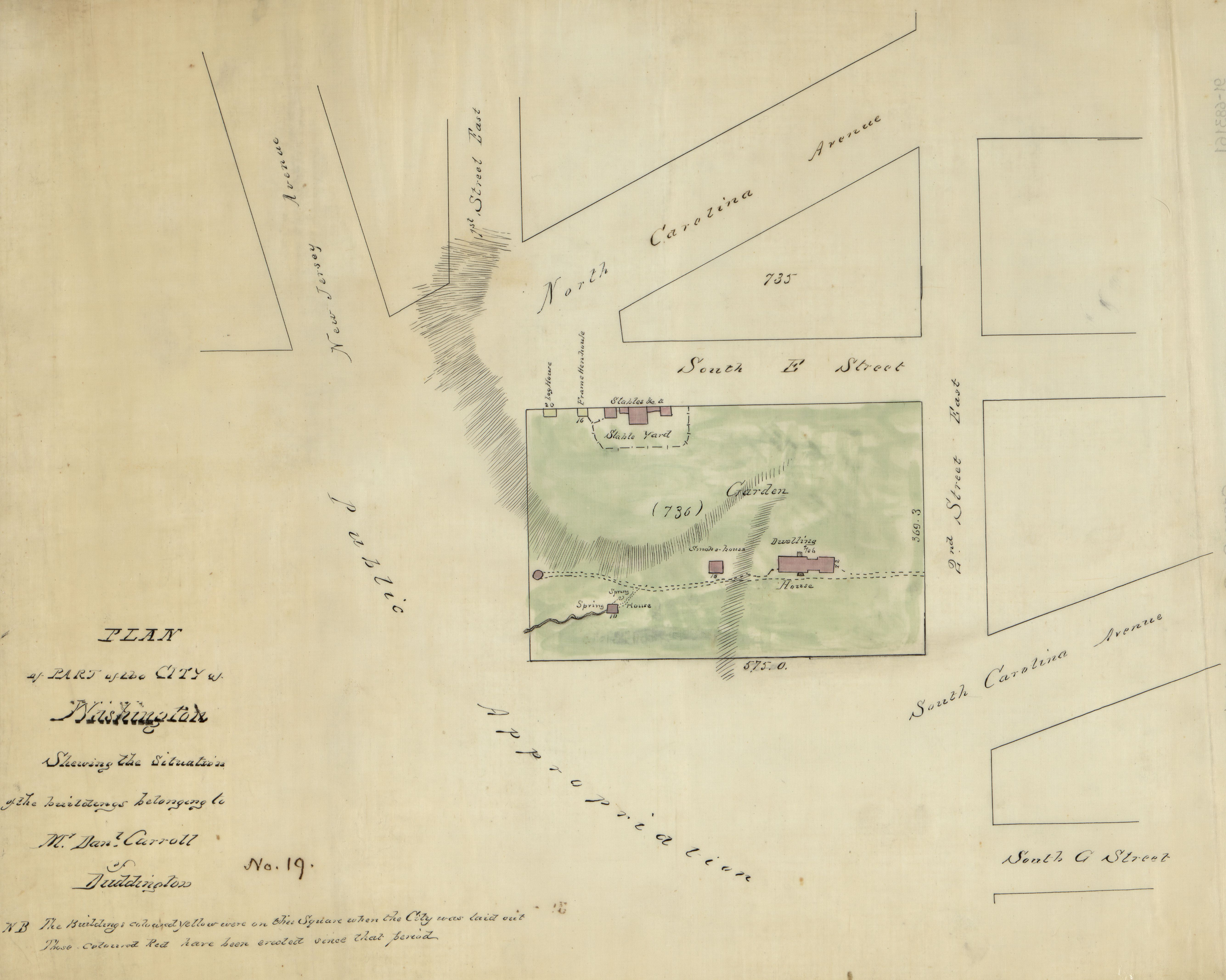
Map showing Daniel Carroll's home protruding into New Jersey Ave, SE, which L'Enfant tore down, c. 1796

Andrew Ellicott's 1792 revision of L'Enfant's 1791 plan for the "Federal City", later Washington City, District of Columbia, in present-day Washington, D.C.

L'Enfant secured the lease of quarries at Wigginton Island and further southeast along Aquia Creek off the lower Potomac River's southern bank in Virginia to supply well-regarded "Aquia Creek sandstone" for the foundation and later for the wall slabs and blocks of the "Congress House" in November 1791. However, his temperament and his insistence that his city design be realized as a whole brought him into conflict with the Commissioners, who wanted to direct the limited funds available into the construction of the Federal buildings. In this, they had the support of Secretary of State Thomas Jefferson. Meanwhile, a concurrent plot began brewing that involved a local and wealthy landowner named Daniel Carroll of Duddington. He built a house that protruded exactly where L'Enfant planned for New Jersey Avenue SE to run; L'Enfant had ordered that the house be torn down.

During a contentious period in February 1792, Andrew Ellicott, who had been conducting the original boundary survey of the future District of Columbia (see: Boundary markers of the original District of Columbia) and the survey of the "Federal City" under the direction of the Commissioners, informed the Commissioners that L'Enfant had not been able to have the city plan engraved and had refused to provide him with the original plan (of which L'Enfant had prepared several versions). Additionally, L'Enfant hinted that he rendered draft plans for the "Congress House" and "President's House", but he was not ready to share them. During a trip to Philadelphia in December 1791, his office had been burgled and sketches and plans for the city and public buildings had been stolen.

Andrew Ellicott stated in his letters that, although he was refused the original plan, he was familiar with L'Enfant's system and had many notes of the surveys that he had made himself. It is, therefore, possible that Ellicott recreated the plan. Ellicott, with the aid of his brother, Benjamin Ellicott, later revised the plan, despite L'Enfant's protests. Ellicott's revisions included the straightening of Massachusetts Avenue, the removal of Randolph Square (close to present-day Shaw Library) and geometric changes to the public spaces. In L'Enfant's plan, the original design of what became known as Dupont Circle was rectangular while Logan Circle featured a triangular shape.

In a last-ditch attempt, Washington sent his private secretary Tobias Lear to stop L'Enfant from walking off the job, but to no success. After a brief exchange he told Lear that "that he had already heard enough of the matter," and presumably slammed the door in his face. Shortly thereafter, an incensed Washington dismissed L'Enfant due to insubordination. Andrew Ellicott continued the city survey in accordance with the revised plan, several versions of which were engraved, published and distributed. As a result, Ellicott's revisions subsequently became the basis for the capital city's development. Ellicott's brother Joseph later adopted the radial plan of Washington for Buffalo, New York.

However, L'Enfant was not the only person to experience frustration overseeing the project. Ellicott complained to Washington on March 16, 1793, and expressed immense dissatisfaction at being rushed through his work. He left the project and the role of chief surveyor and planner fell to a succession of men: Isaac Briggs, Benjamin Ellicott and Joseph Ellicott, Thomas Freeman, Nicholas King, Robert King Sr., and Nicholas King again. In 1802, Jefferson relieved the Commissioners of their duties and appointed three individuals to report directly to him on matters concerning the city's development: Thomas Munroe was appointed superintendent, Nicholas King assumed the role of surveyor for the federal city, and Benjamin Latrobe was designated as surveyor of public buildings.

=== Later works ===
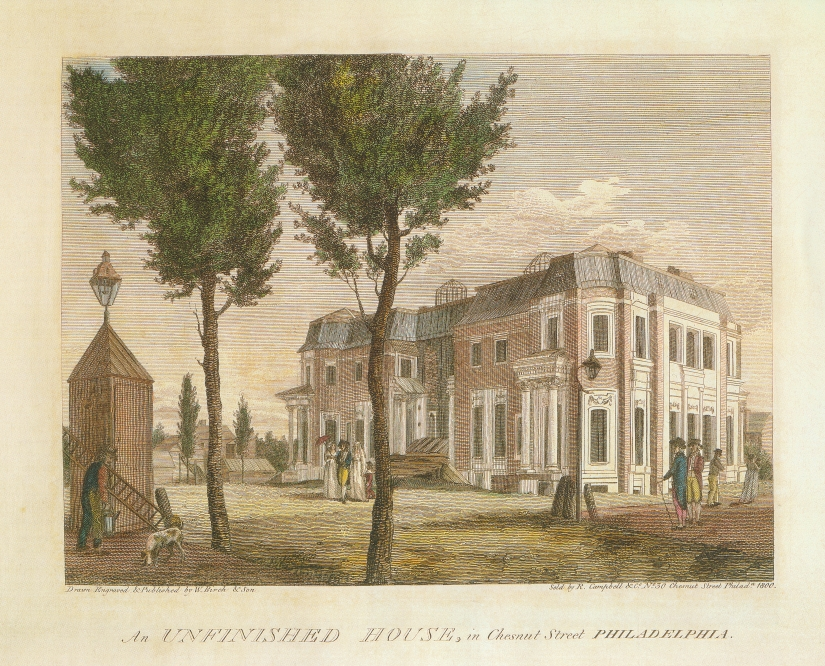
An 1800 engraving of L'Enfant by William Russell Birch

Soon after leaving the national capital area, L'Enfant prepared the initial plans for the city of Paterson, in northeast New Jersey along the Passaic River, but was discharged from this project after a year had passed. However, in 1846 the city reinstated the original scheme proposed by L'Enfant after the city's raceway system encountered problems. During the same period (1792–1793) he designed Robert Morris's mansion in Philadelphia, which was never finished because of his delays and Morris's bankruptcy. In 1794, L'Enfant was placed in charge of reconstructing Fort Mifflin on Mud Island in the Delaware River below Philadelphia.

In 1812, L'Enfant was offered a position as a professor of engineering at United States Military Academy, at West Point, New York, but declined that post. He later served as a professor of engineering at West Point from 1813 to 1817. In 1814, acting secretary of war James Monroe hired L'Enfant to oversee the design and reconstruction of Fort Washington on the Potomac River southeast of Washington, D.C., but others soon replaced him. Monroe urged L'Enfant to be more economical as project costs soared. Ultimately, L'Enfant left the project due to these financial issues.

L'Enfant had no part in planning or platting Perrysburg, Ohio, or Indianapolis, Indiana, as has been claimed in Internet postings. Alexander Bourne, Joseph Wampler and William Brookfield surveyed and platted the future Perrysburg area in 1816. Alexander Ralston, an engineer who had assisted L'Enfant in planning the city of Washington, used elements of L'Enfant's plan for his own design and survey in the 1820s of the future city of Indianapolis (the state capital of Indiana).

== Death ==
L'Enfant approached his financial matters with a casual attitude, especially related to payment for his work. Operating on a gentlemanly code of conduct, L'Enfant believed that if he committed his efforts to a project, he would eventually receive compensation and/or more work, without the need for formal contracts. This laissez-faire approach meant that L'Enfant often found himself in precarious financial situations. L'Enfant also valued fame and notoriety over money and land. After his work on Federal Hall for Washington's inauguration, the Common Council of New York offered L'Enfant honorary citizenship and a 10-acre (4.0 ha) plot on the city's northern edge; he accepted citizenship, but declined the plot. However, in times of financial desperation, he demanded back pay for his work and was dissatisfied when the amounts offered did not meet his expectations.

In an 1806 journal entry, architect Benjamin Latrobe said the following of the major: "Daily through the city stalks the picture of famine, L'Enfant and his dog. The plan of the city is probably his, though others claim it. He had the courage to undertake any public work whatever was offered to him. He has not succeeded in any, but was always honest and is now miserably poor. He is too proud to receive any assistance, and it is very doubtful in what manner he subsists."

After many years of petitioning for back pay and recognition, the United States Congress paid L'Enfant $4,600 in 1808 and $1,300 in 1810 for his work on the federal city. However, he lost most of the money from a lawsuit filed by his friend and housemate, Richard Soderstrom, the Swedish counsel to the United States. Soderstrom claimed that the L'Enfant owed him for a decade worth of rent, firewood, and meals among other things. He had supported L'Enfant with his quest for back pay and was also in a position to know when Congress might act on the matter. Sadly, L'Enfant "had become the victim of an outright swindle."

In his final years, he befriended Thomas Digges and became a permanent guest at the family estate in Maryland. His days there consisted of tending to flowers, passionately absorbing himself in work, and recuperating from his medical afflictions. L'Enfant died on June 14, 1825, and was originally buried at the Green Hill farm in Chillum, Prince George's County, Maryland. He left behind three watches, three compasses, some books, some maps, and surveying instruments; the total value was forty-six dollars.

== Legacy ==
The National Mall in Washington, D.C. with its livestock and the Treasury Building in the background in April 1865

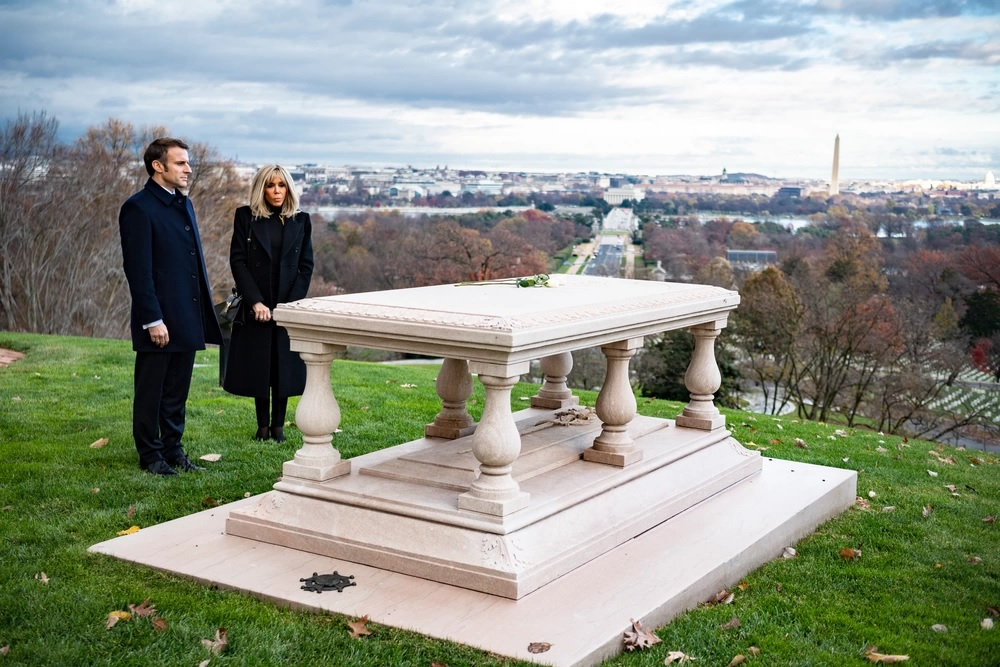
French President Macron and his wife at L'Enfant's grave in 2022

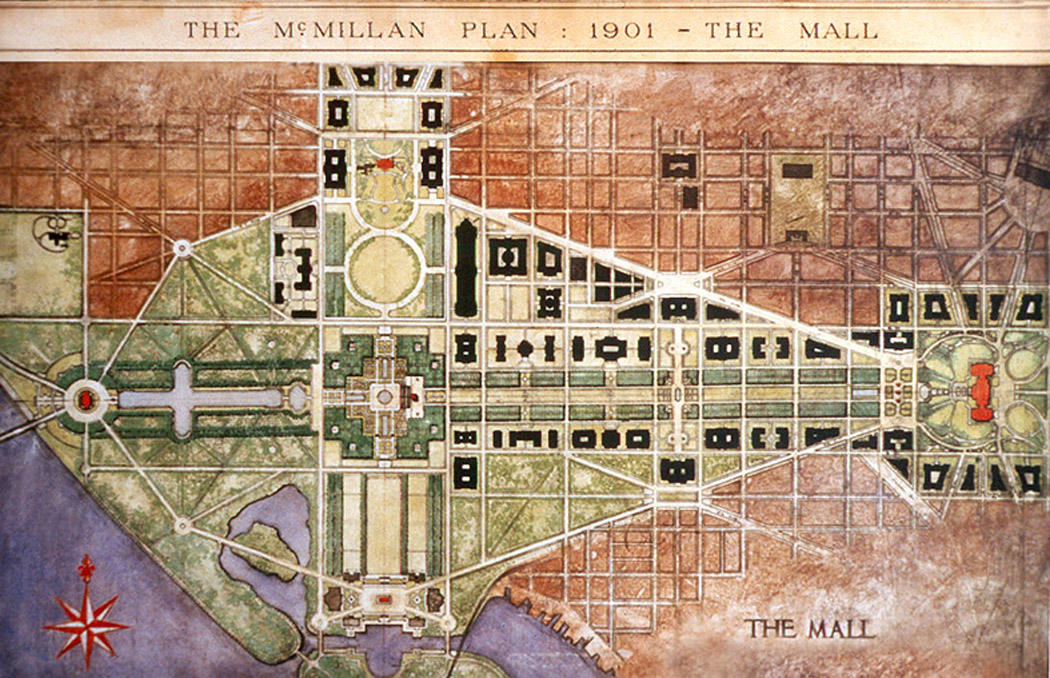
The National Mall in Washington, D.C., the centerpiece of the 1901 McMillan Plan

For four decades following L'Enfant's death, Washington was seen as a stillborn city, growing slowly and remaining a collection of muddy villages. After John Adams left office, Democratic-Republicans insisted the federal city remain small and modest, believing in limited government and fearing grandiose buildings would symbolize excessive power. They aimed for a capital reflecting republican virtues of simplicity and frugality, avoiding European-style ostentation and ensuring the city did not overshadow the states.

Between the administrations of Thomas Jefferson and Abraham Lincoln, many presidents neglected the city's overall upkeep and development, resulting in inadequate infrastructure, poor planning, and overall chaos. In an 1800 letter to the commissioners, L'Enfant accused some politicians of being infatuated with the idea of the city becoming a "mere contemptible hamlet." The lack of basic infrastructure led to unsanitary conditions, with the Washington City Canal becoming an open sewer. Summer heat and oppressive humidity compounded these issues. President Lincoln's third son died from typhoid fever likely due to contaminated water. Crime and gang violence proliferated, creating the rise of unstable neighborhoods like Hell's Bottom (Shaw), Murder Bay (Federal Triangle), and Swampoodle (NoMa). The Mall was a wasteland where animals grazed casually around an unfinished Washington Monument. Slave trading was rampant and often operated near the Capitol and White House.

Charles Dickens, in his 1842 visit, famously characterized the city as "the City of Magnificent Intentions" due to its incomplete streets and buildings. Considered a national embarrassment, the capital faced significant challenges, transforming into a hotbed of issues that tarnished its image. Foreign diplomats considered their assignments to the city as a hardship post.

The city's fortunes changed after the American Civil War and the election of President Ulysses S. Grant and his appointment of Alexander Robey Shepherd as head of the DC Board of Public Works from 1871 to 1873. Shepherd rapidly improved infrastructure by paving roads, installing gas and sewer lines, and planting thousands of trees. Through these investments in public works, Grant squashed debates about moving the capital westward. In 1874, landscape architect Frederick Law Olmsted was asked to redesign the Capitol grounds, addressing issues with its placement by building marble terraces on the west front.

At the beginning of the 20th century, the ideals of the City Beautiful movement influenced the McMillan Commission under the leadership of Senator James McMillan, (1838–1902) of Michigan, who modified L'Enfant's plan within a report that recommended a partial redesign of the capital city. Among other things, the commission's report laid out a plan for a sweeping mall in the area of L'Enfant's widest "grand avenue", which had not yet been constructed. The McMillan Plan has since been instrumental in the further development of Washington, D.C. (See: History of Washington, D.C. in the 20th century). Frederick Law Olmsted Jr., led the Commission alongside Daniel Burnham, Charles Follen McKim and Augustus Saint-Gaudens. Together, they sought to breathe new life into L'Enfant's original vision, aiming to restore and elevate the beauty of the nation's monumental core. To fuel their creative aspirations, they embarked on a transformative tour of Europe, to truly understand the beauty and monumentality that had inspired L'Enfant. Their mission was not just to undo past damages but to re-imagine a grander, more harmonious capital, one that would reflect the nation's ideals and aspirations.

At the instigation of a French ambassador to the United States, Jean Jules Jusserand, L'Enfant's adopted nation then recognized his contributions. In 1909, L'Enfant's remains were exhumed from their burial site at Green Hill and placed in a metal-lined casket. After lying in state at the Capitol rotunda, L'Enfant was re-interred in front of Arlington House on a slope in Arlington National Cemetery in Virginia. His re-burial site overlooks the Potomac River and the portion of Washington, D.C., that he had originally designed. In 1911, a monument was placed on top of L'Enfant's grave during a dedication ceremony at which President William Howard Taft, Jusserand, and Senator Elihu Root spoke. Engraved on the monument is a portion of L'Enfant's plan in a diagram map, which Andrew Ellicott's revision and the McMillan Commission's plan had superseded.

When the British decided to move the capital of their British Raj Empire from Calcutta to Delhi in 1911, by creating a new district of the latter entitled New Delhi, architect Sir Edwin Lutyens took inspiration from the McMillan Plan with the inclusion of broad avenues and a ceremonial axis placing important monuments at strategic locations.

Today, various government agencies such as the National Capital Planning Commission and United States Commission of Fine Arts oversee development in the city and surrounding areas ensuring adherence to the L'Enfant plan and its historical accuracy.

The design and development of Washington, D.C. is the story of six influential men: three presidents and three visionary figures who shaped the city. George Washington, Ulysses S. Grant and Theodore Roosevelt provided crucial presidential leadership, while Pierre Charles L'Enfant, Alexander Robey Shepherd, and Frederick Law Olmsted Jr. made significant contributions to the city's design and development.

Artist Peter Waddell painted the federal city plan in the way L'Enfant intended it to look; the painting is called The Indispensable Plan.

== Honors ==
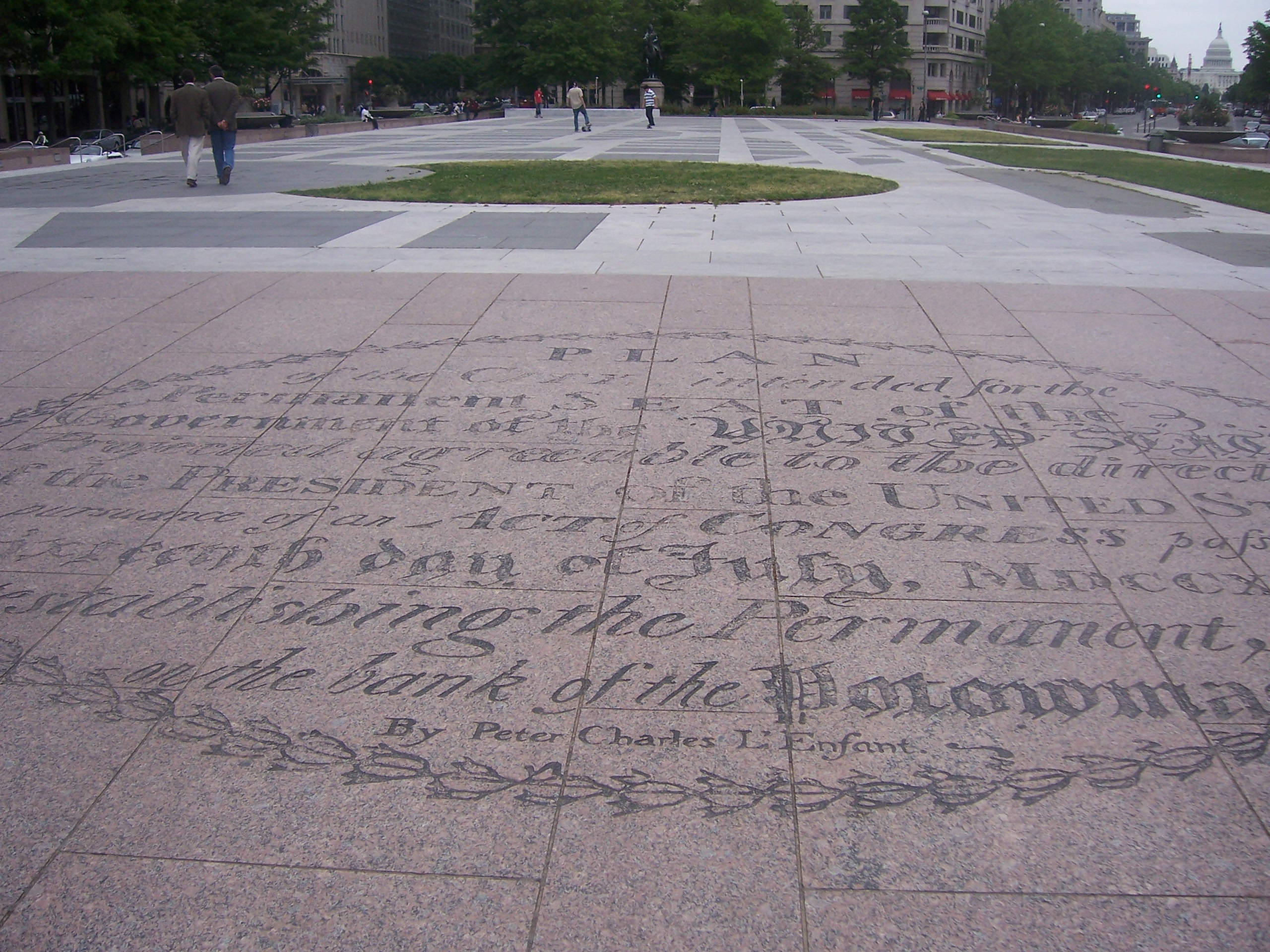
An oval inscribed in Freedom Plaza in Washington, D.C., containing the title of the L'Enfant Plan, followed by the words "By Peter Charles L'Enfant"

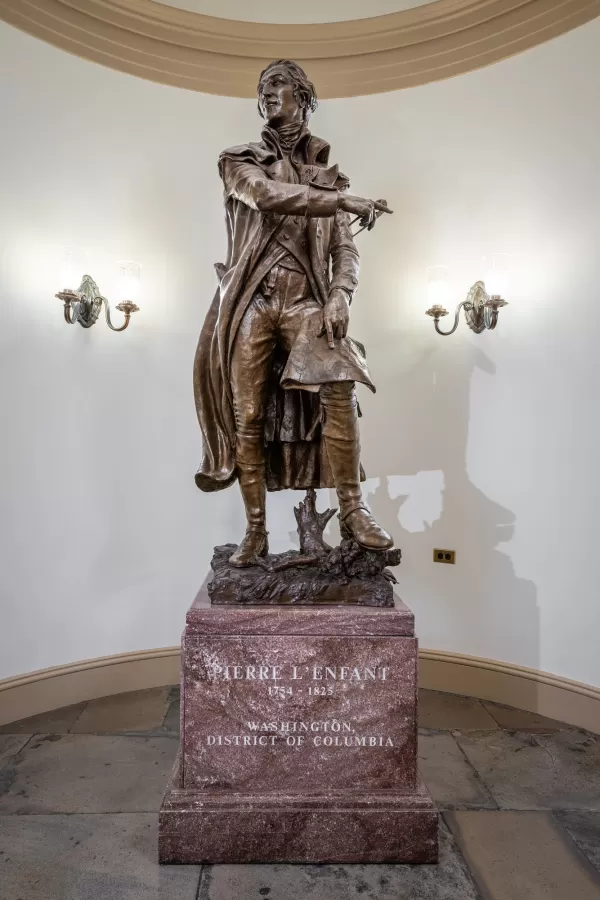
A statue of Pierre Charles L'Enfant represented inside the U.S. Capitol, Washington, D.C.

- In 1942, an American cargo-carrying Liberty ship in World War II named the S.S. Pierre L'Enfant was launched, part of a series of almost 2,000 ships mass-produced in an "assembly-line" fashion from eleven coastal shipyards. In 1970, she was shipwrecked and abandoned.
- L'Enfant Plaza, a complex of office buildings, was dedicated in 1968 and named for the architect. It includes the 1972 headquarters of the United States Postal Service, an adjacent L'Enfant Plaza Hotel, an office building and underground parking garage, and a series of underground corridors with a shopping center, centered around an esplanade ('L'Enfant Promenade") in southwest Washington, D.C.. Meeting rooms in the L'Enfant Plaza Hotel bear the names of French artists, military leaders, and explorers. The central portion of the plaza contains an engraved map of the city by Pierre L'Enfant from 1791. Within the city map is a smaller map that shows the plaza's location.
- Beneath L'Enfant Plaza is one of the central Metro subway stops in Washington, D.C., the L'Enfant Plaza station.
- In 1980, Western Plaza (subsequently renamed to "Freedom Plaza") opened in downtown Washington, D.C., adjacent to Pennsylvania Avenue, N.W. A raised marble inlay in the Plaza's surface depicts parts of L'Enfant's 1791 plan for the City of Washington. The inlay contains an oval bearing the title of the plan followed by the words "By Peter Charles L'Enfant".
- In 2003, L'Enfant's 1791 Plan for Washington was commemorated on a USPS commemorative postage stamp. The diamond shape of the stamp reflects the original 100 square miles (259 km^{2}) tract of land selected for the District. Shown is a view along the National Mall, including the Capitol, the Washington Monument, and the Lincoln Memorial. Also portrayed are cherry blossoms around the "Tidal Basin" and row houses from the Shaw neighborhood.
- The Government of Washington, D.C. commissioned a statue of L'Enfant in 2008 that now resides in the U.S. Capitol as part of the National Statuary Hall Collection as of February 2022. Federal Law only allows U.S. states (and not federal territories, commonwealths, districts or other possessions) to contribute statues to the Collection, which the District of Columbia's Delegate to the U.S. House of Representatives, Eleanor Holmes Norton, attempted to have Congress change the law to permit the installation of the statue to represent the District in the Statuary Hall. The statue was displayed in the historic John A. Wilson District Building for the municipal government offices on Pennsylvania Avenue prior to the Capitol.
- Since 2005, the National Building Museum in Washington, D.C. has held an annual "L'Enfant Lecture on City Planning and Design" to draw attention to critical issues in city and regional planning in the United States.
- The American Planning Association (APA) has created an award named in "L'Enfant's honor" which recognizes excellence in international planning.
- In a presentation at the University of Toronto, landscape architect Kathryn Gustafson said "L'Enfant's plan was one of the most amazing urban plans in the world."

== Gallery ==
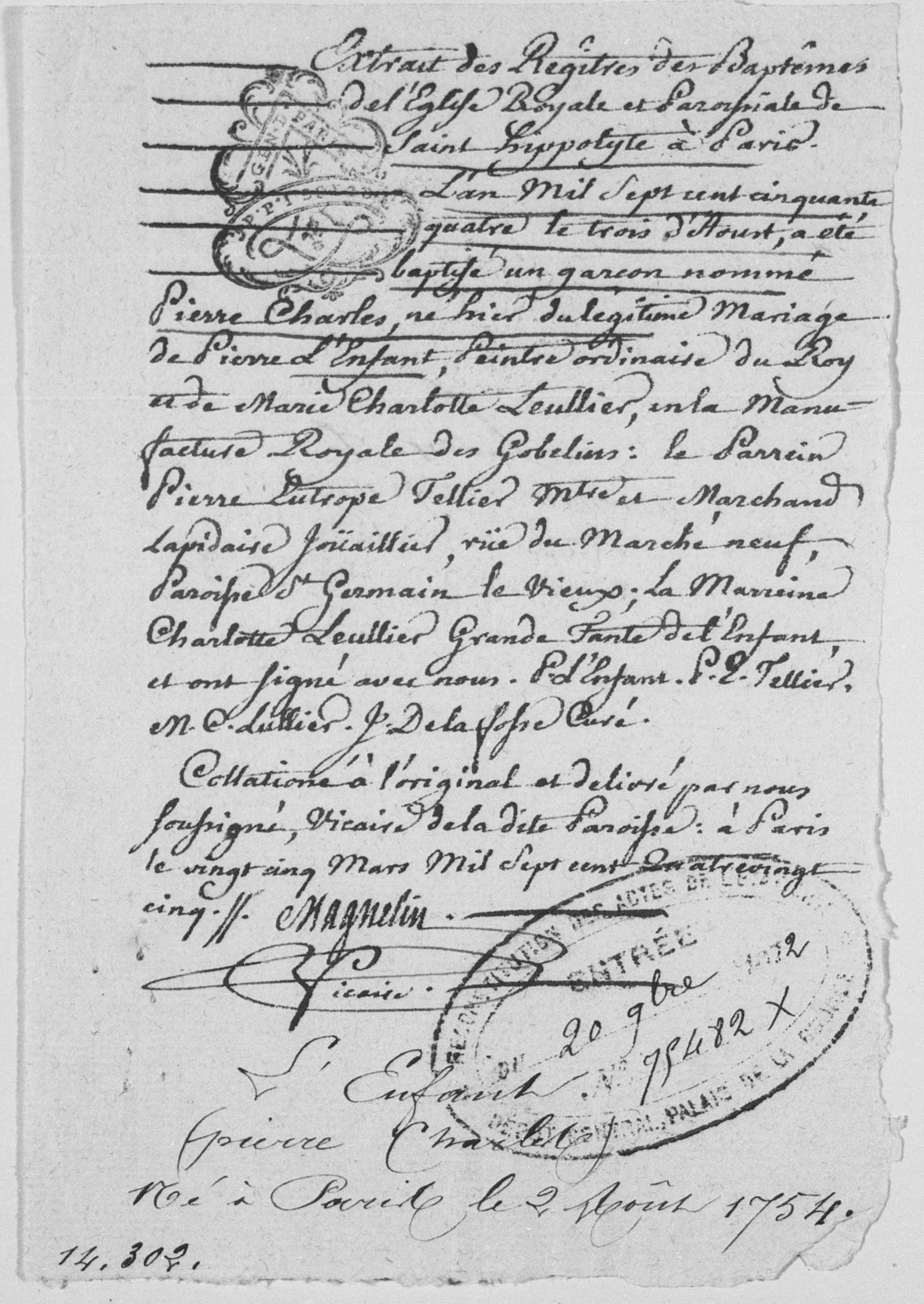
Pierre L'Enfant's baptism certificate dated August 3, 1754 in the Saint-Hippolyte church in Paris

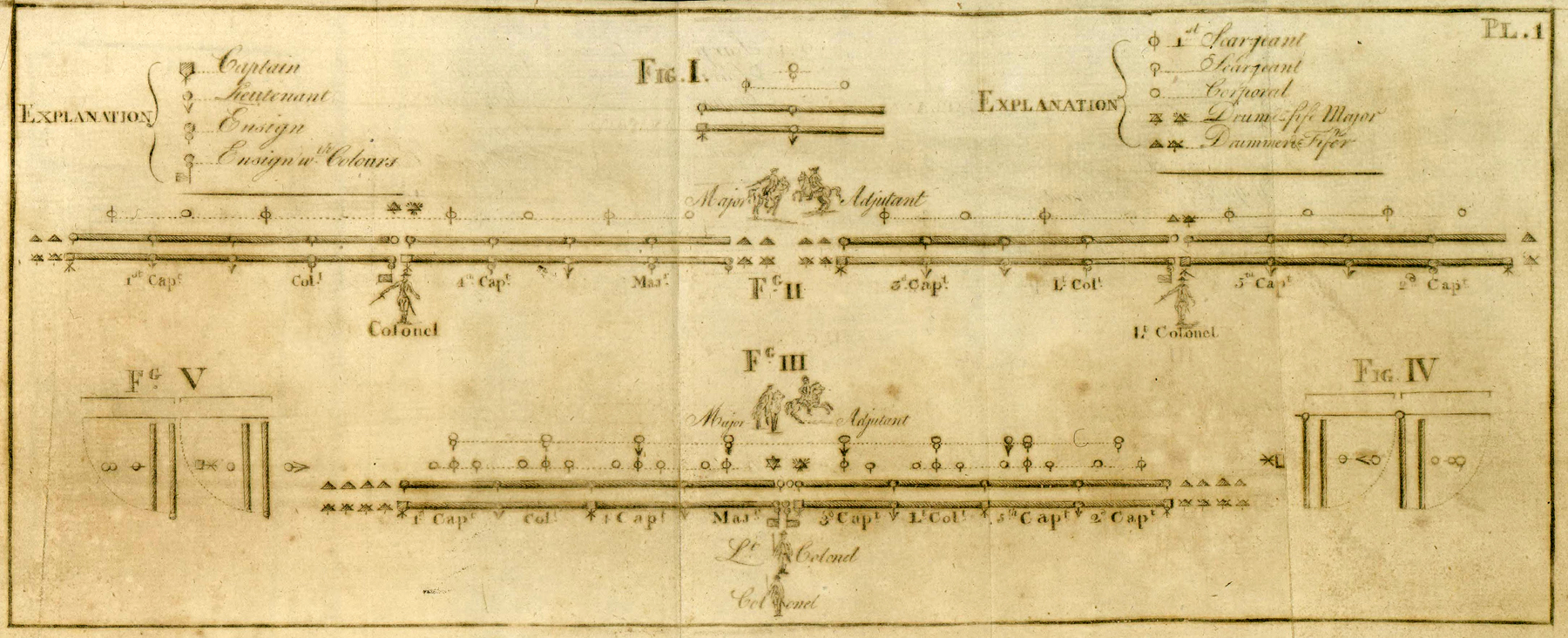
Plate I design by L'Enfant: Regulations for the Order and Discipline of the Troops of the United States

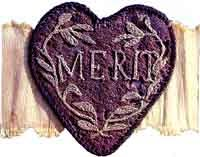
The Purple Heart may have been designed by L'Enfant in 1782.

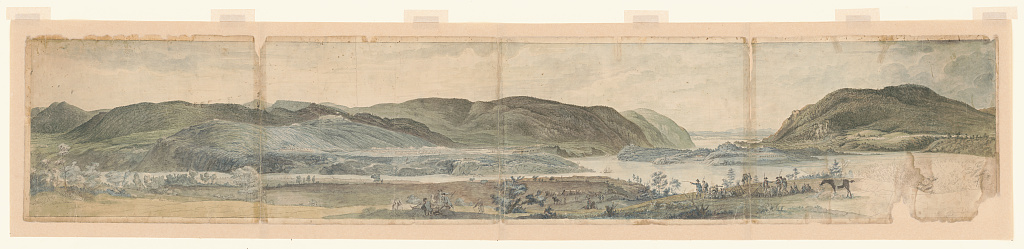
West Point watercolor, c. 1782

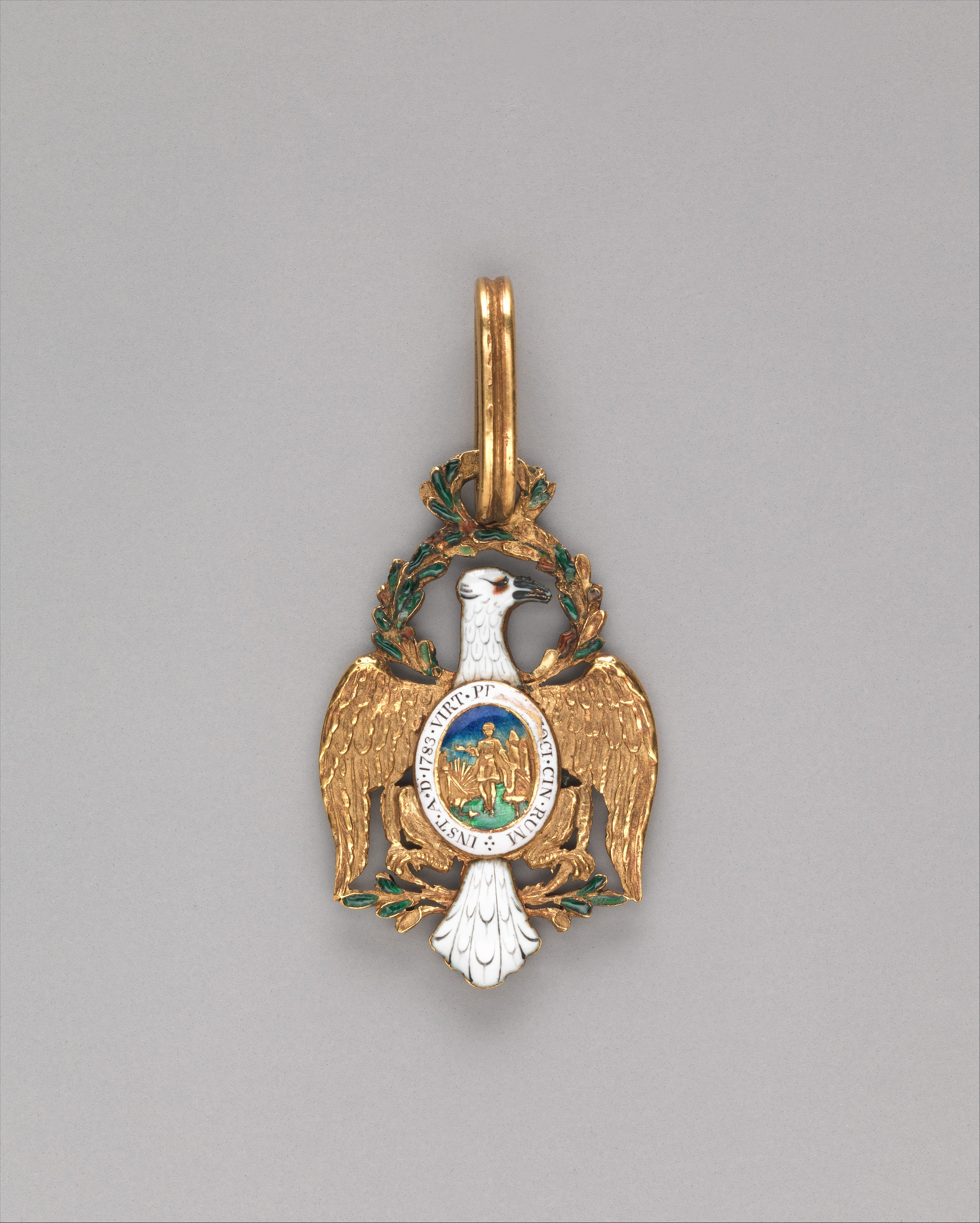
Insignia of the Society of Cincinnati, c. 1783

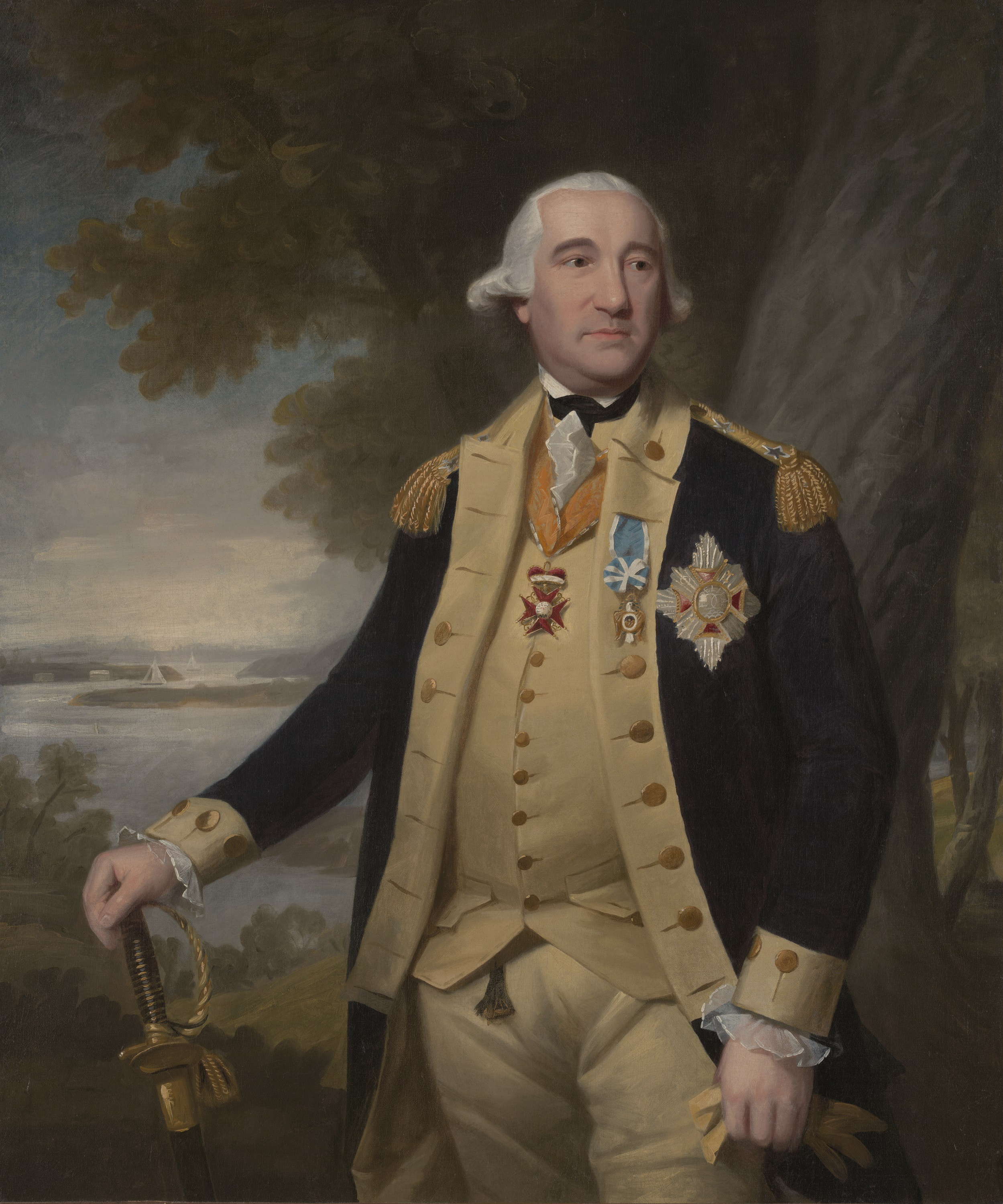
Portrait of Major General von Steuben wearing the badge of the Society of the Cincinnati by Ralph Earl

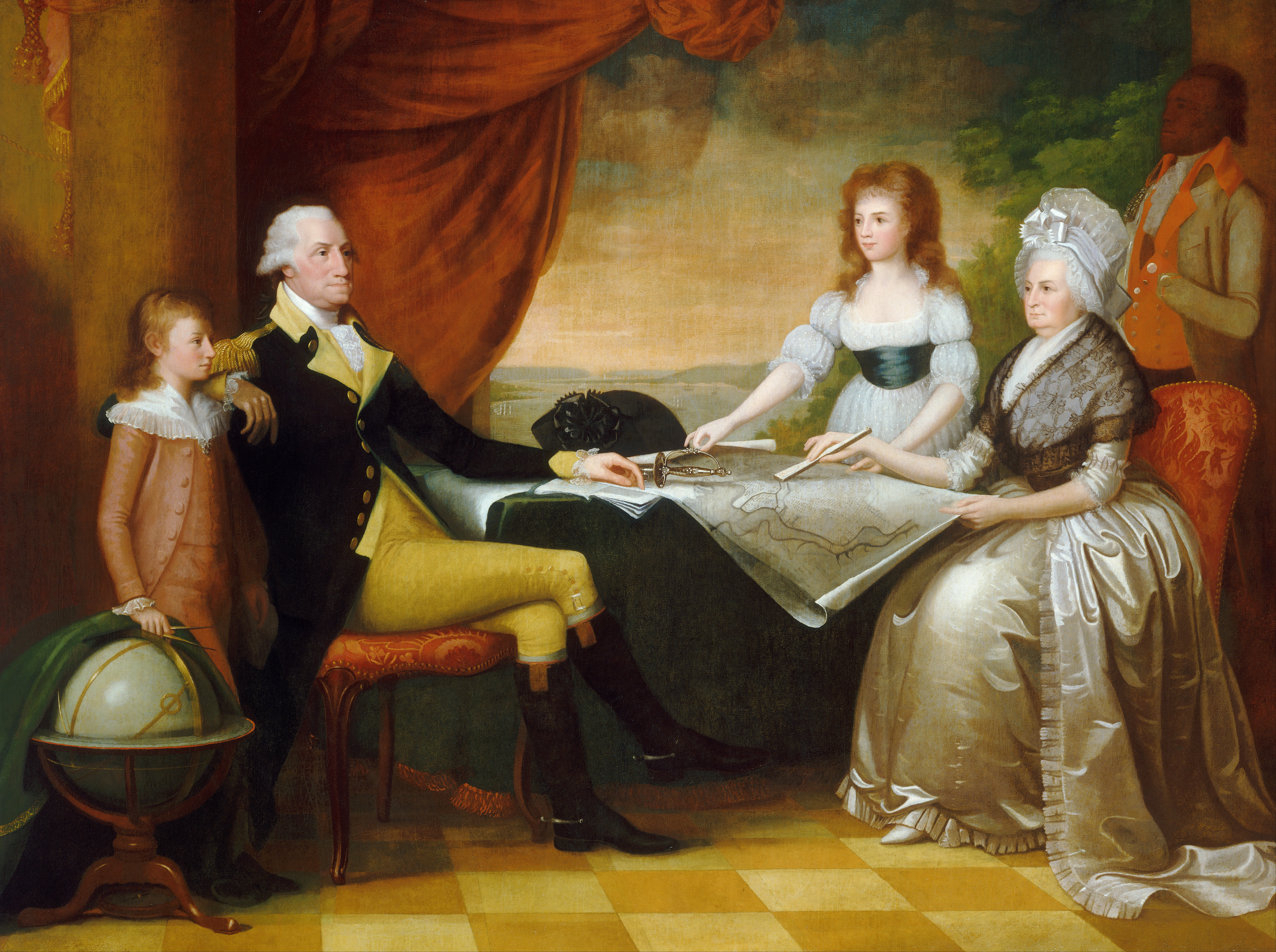
L'Enfant's plan featured in The Washington family portrait by Edward Savage

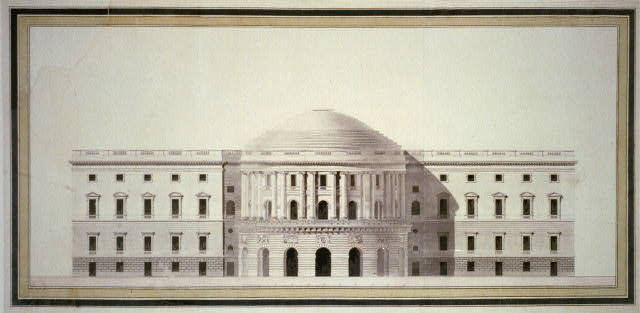
Stephen Hallet's design for the US Capitol in 1793 features the "great circular room and dome".

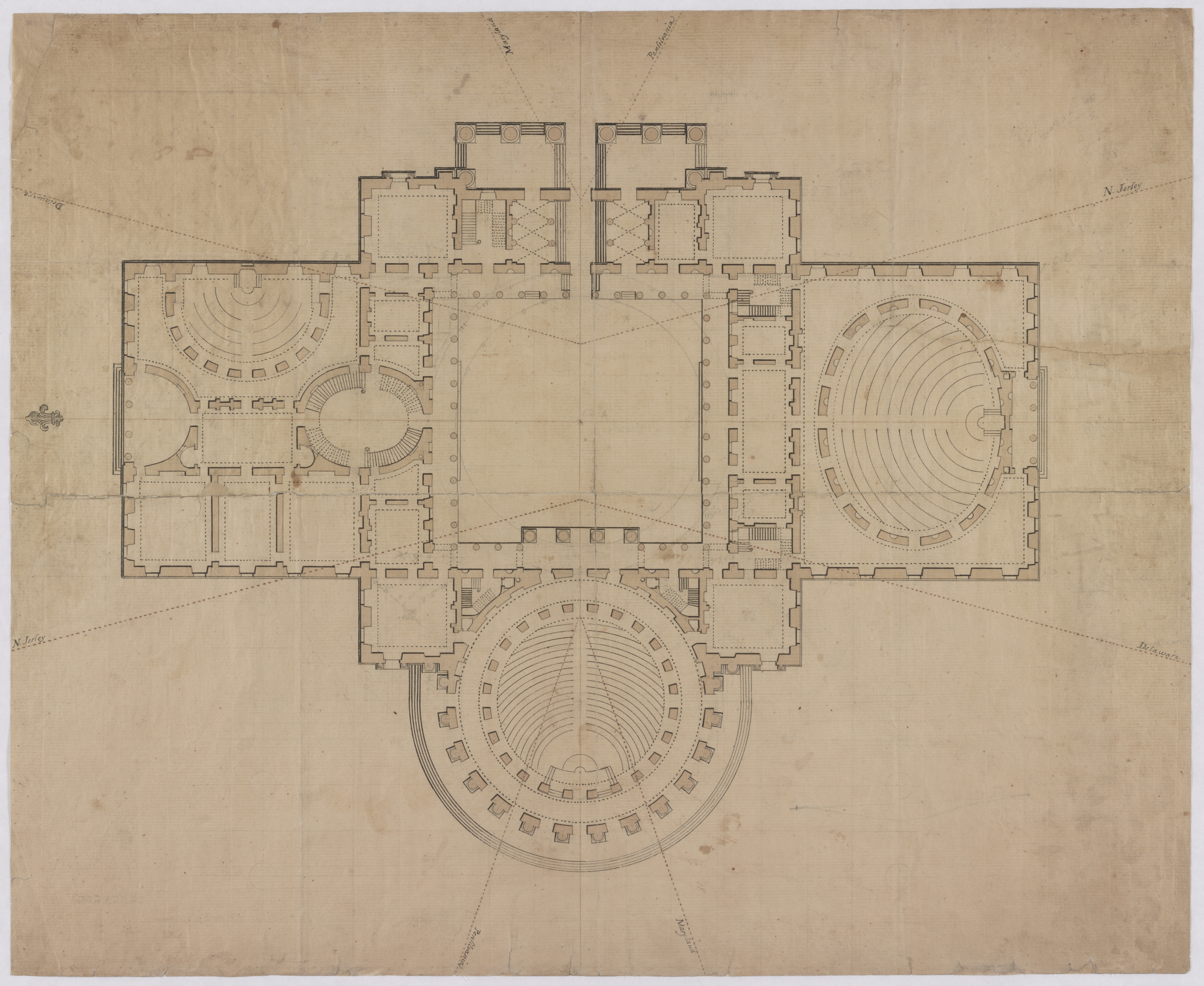
United States Capitol ("Federal Capitol"), floor plan by Stephen Hallet

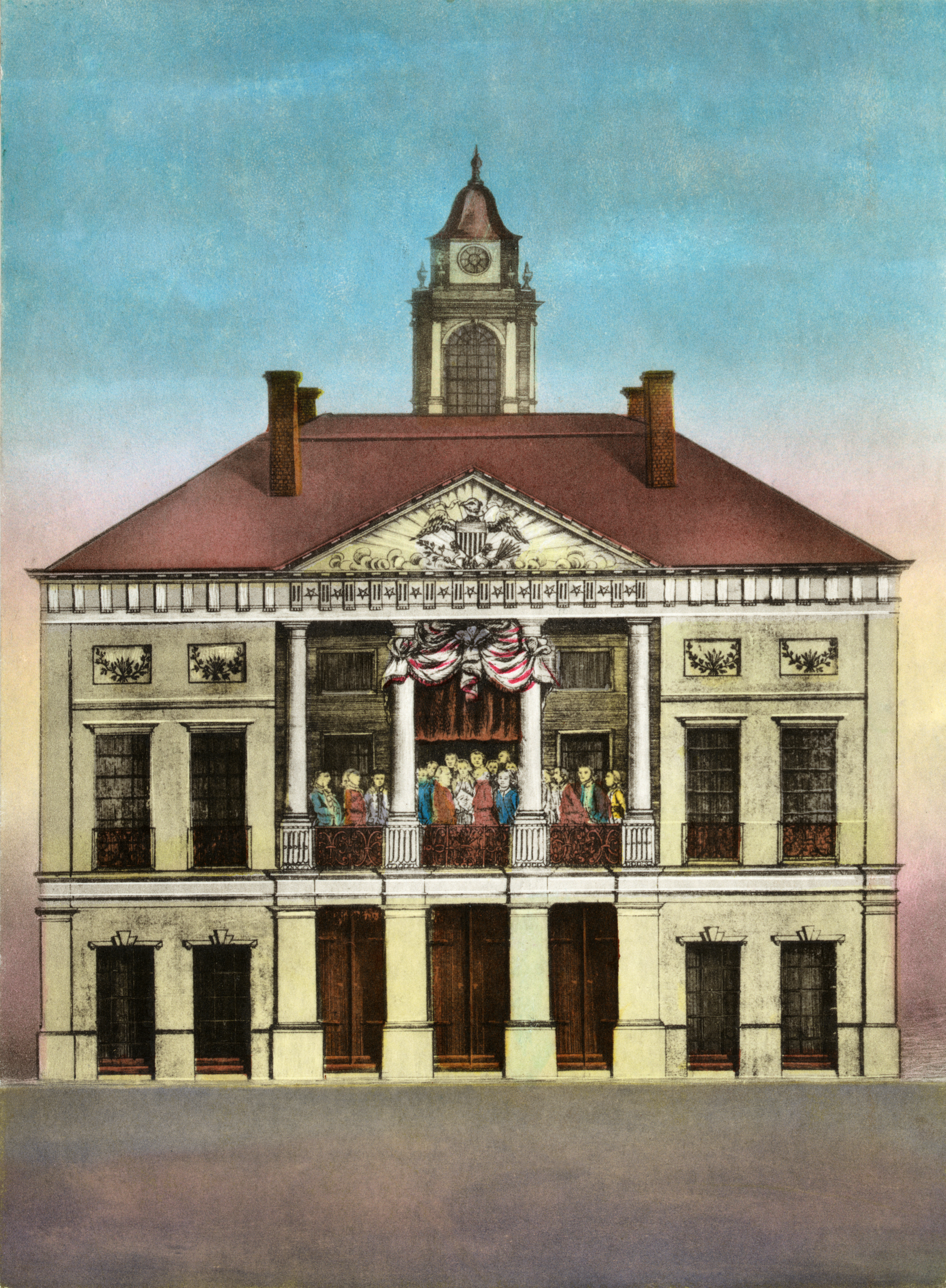
Federal Hall, 1790 hand-colored engraving depicting Washington's April 30, 1789, inauguration

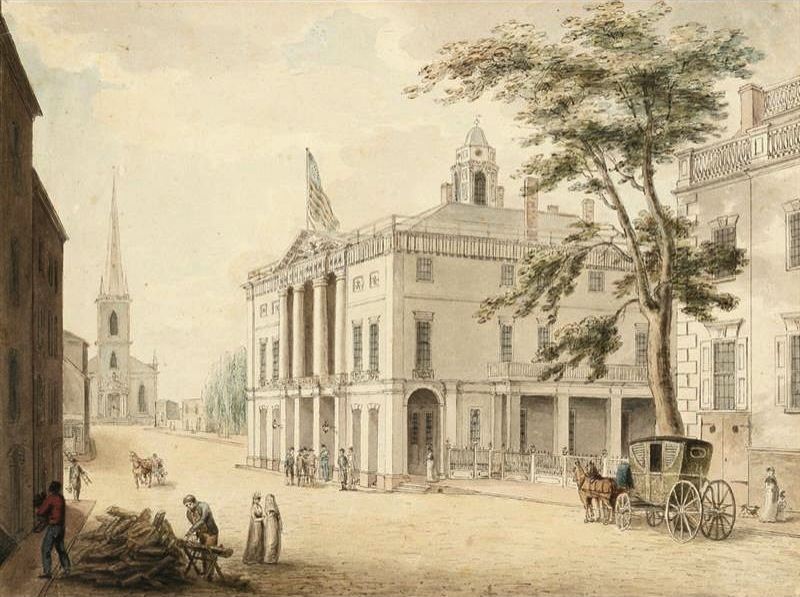
Archibald Robertson's view up Wall Street with City Hall (Federal Hall) and Trinity Church, New York City, from around 1798

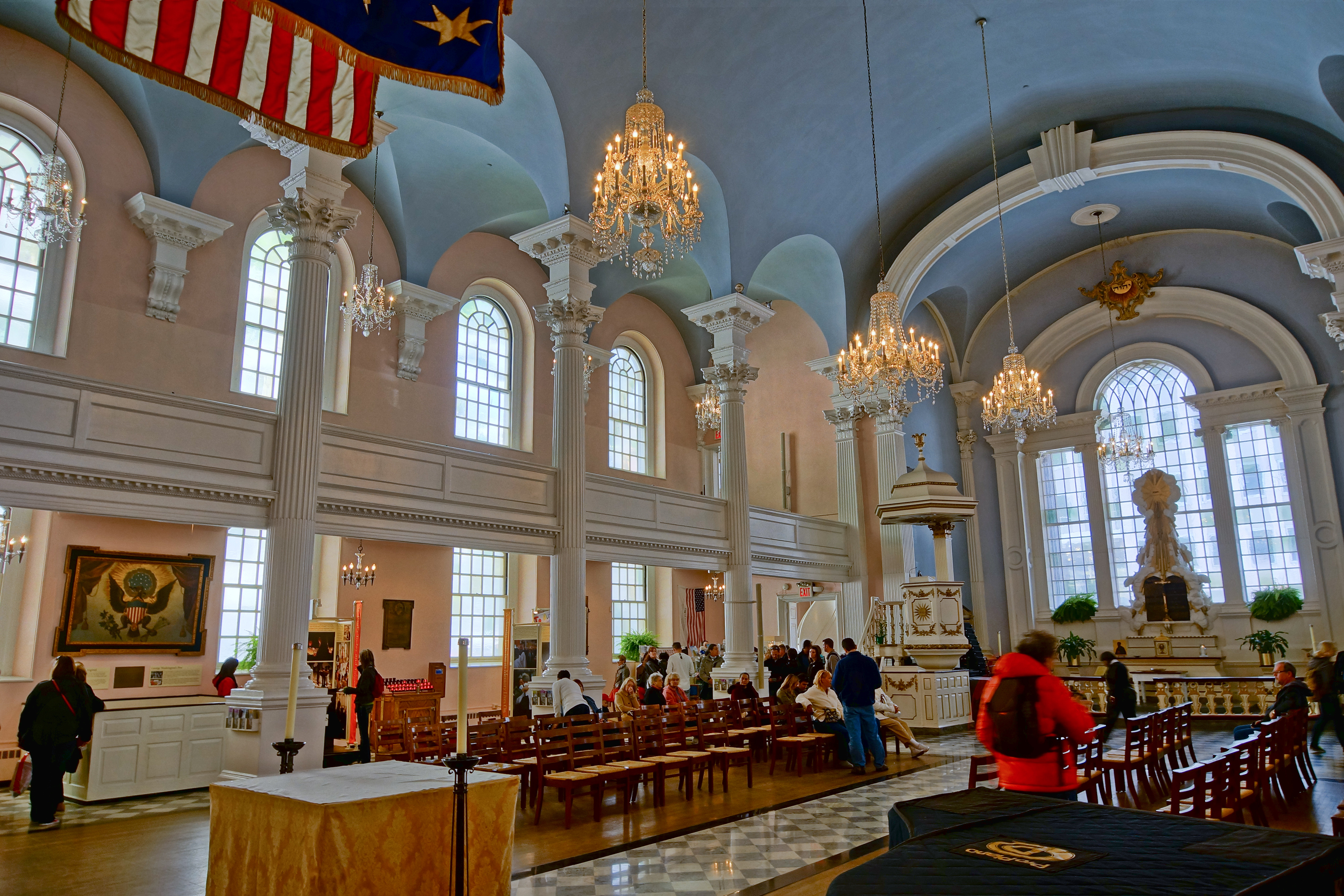
Interior of St. Paul's Chapel with L'Enfant's ornamental treatment (far right) above the altar

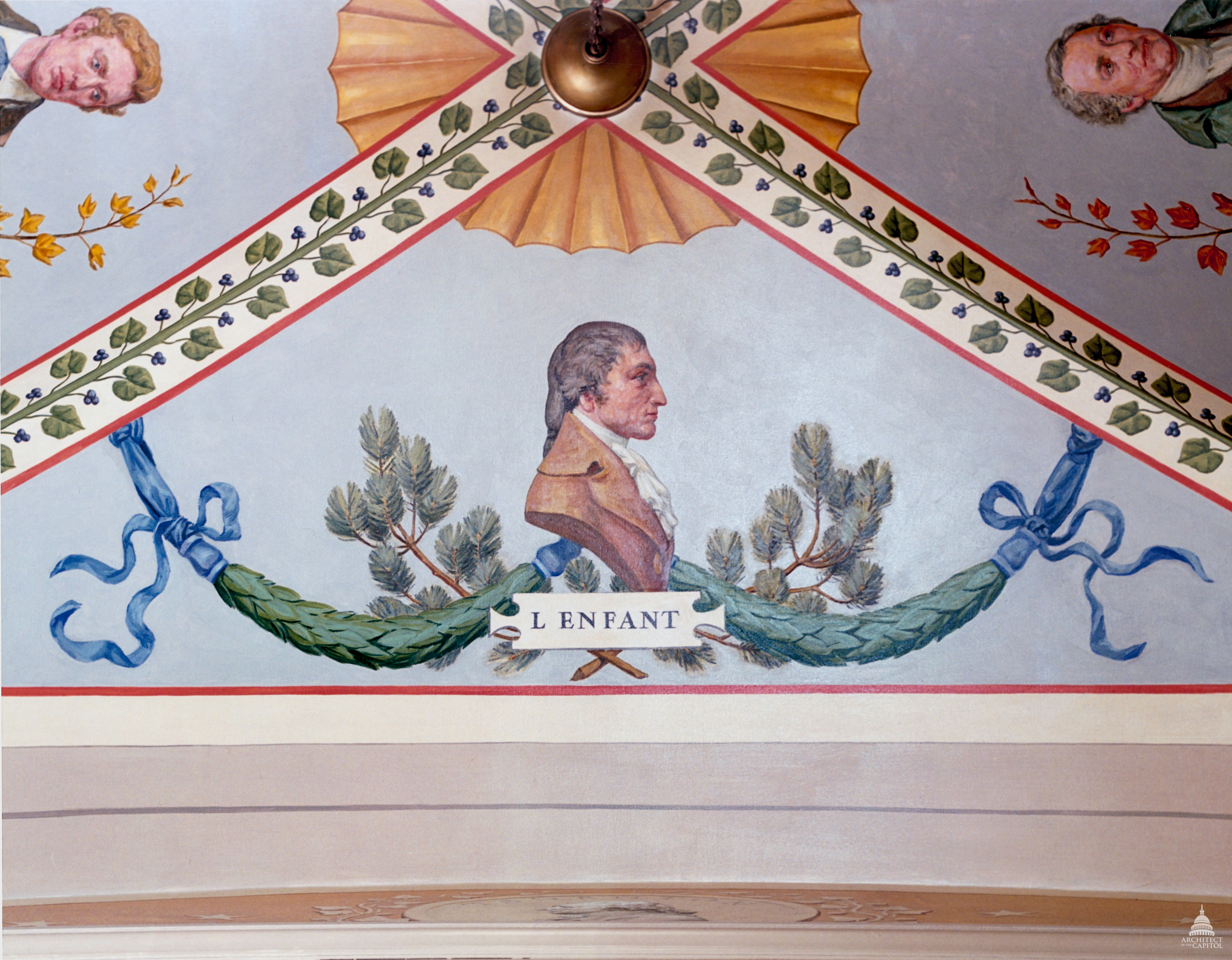
L'Enfant by Allyn Cox, oil on canvas, US Capitol, 1973–1974

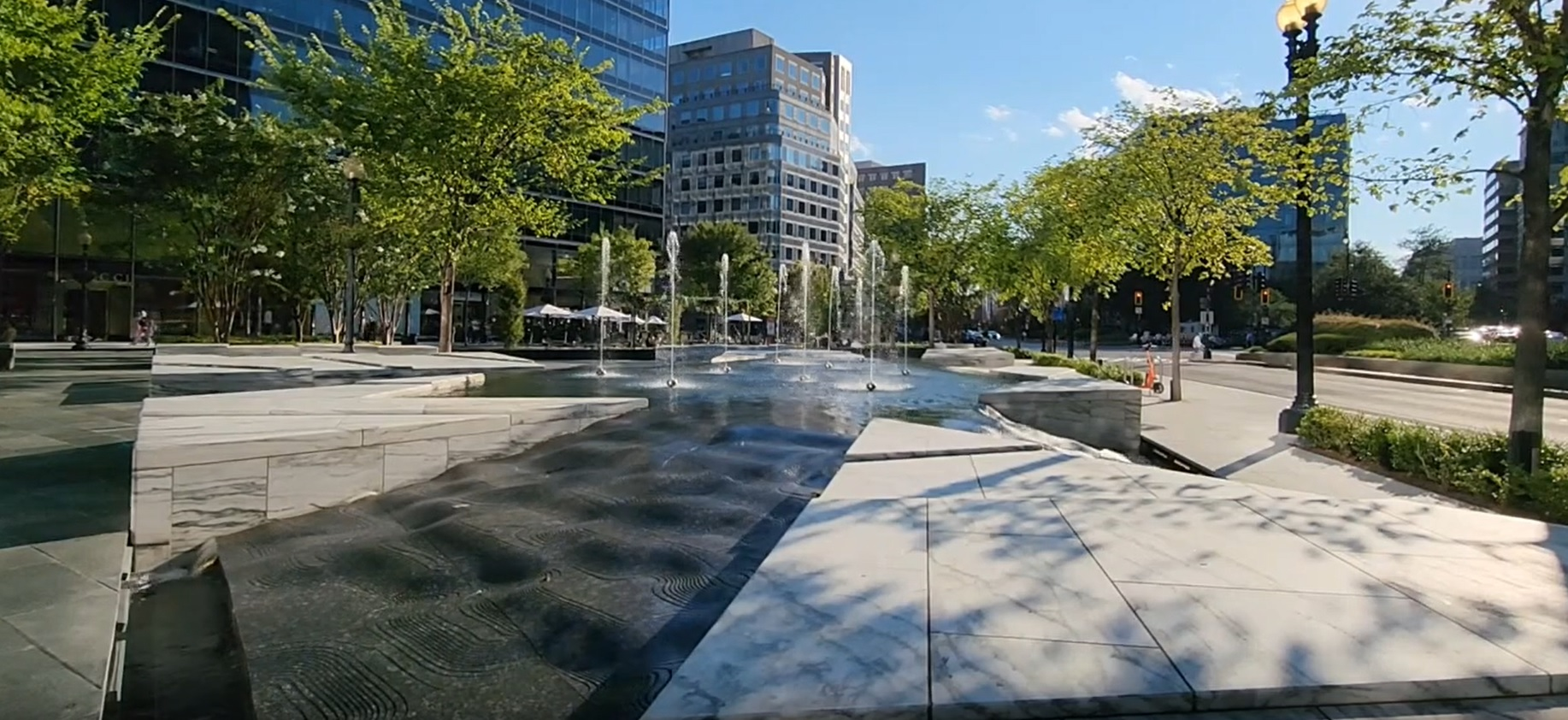
One of the five grand fountains at the CityCenterDC complex

== Bibliography ==
- Berg, Scott W. (2007). Grand Avenues: The Story of the French Visionary Who Designed Washington, D.C. Pantheon Books. ISBN 978-0-375-42280-5. LCCN 2006021764. OCLC 70267127 – via Internet Archive.
- Bowling, Kenneth R (2002). Peter Charles L'Enfant: vision, honor, and male friendship in the early American Republic. Washington, D.C.: George Washington University. ISBN 0972761101. LCCN 2003385101. OCLC 606900534 – via Google Books.
  - Sterling, Christopher (May 2003). "Revisiting an Old Controversy: Review of Bowling, Kenneth R. (2002), Peter Charles L'Enfant: vision, honor, and male friendship in the early American Republic". H-DC: H-Net Reviews: H-Net Humanities and Social Sciences Online. East Lansing, Michigan: The Center for Humane Arts, Letters, and Social Sciences Online: Department of History: Michigan State University. Archived from the original on June 24, 2017.
- Bryan, Wilhelmus Bogart (1914). A History of the National Capital from its Foundation through the Period of the Adoption of the Organic Act. Vol. 1: 1790–1814. New York: The MacMillan Company. OCLC 902842081 – via HathiTrust Digital Library.
- Caemmerer, H. Paul (1970). The Life of Pierre Charles L'Enfant. Da Capo Press. ISBN 0306713810. OCLC 99500.
- Jusserand, Jean Jules (1916). "Major L'Enfant and the Federal City". With Americans of Past and Present Days. New York: Charles Scribner's Sons. pp. 137–195. OCLC 1075914 – via Google Books.
- Kite, Elizabeth Sarah (1929). L'Enfant and Washington, 1791–1792. Johns Hopkins University Press. OCLC 2898164.
- Morgan, James Dudley M.D. (1899). "Maj. Pierre Charles L'Enfant, The Unhonored and Unrewarded Engineer". Records of the Columbia Historical Society. 2. Washington, D.C.: Columbia Historical Society: 118–157 – via Google Books.
- Stewart, John (1899). "Early Maps and Surveyors of the City of Washington, D.C." Records of the Columbia Historical Society. 2. Washington, D.C.: Columbia Historical Society: 48–71 – via Google Books.
- Worthington, Glen (May 1, 2005). "The Vision of Pierre L'Enfant: A City to Inspire, A Plan to Preserve". Georgetown Law Historic Preservation Papers Series. Paper 9.

Honorary titles
Preceded by William McKinley, Jr.	Persons who have lain in state or honor in the United States Capitol rotunda April 28, 1909 (re-interment)	Succeeded by George Dewey
