= Mary Stevenson =

Mary Stevenson may refer to:

- Mary "Polly" Stevenson Hewson (1739–1795), English polymath and friend of Benjamin Franklin
- Mary Stevenson Gannon (1829–1868), American actor
- Mary Steel Stevenson (1896–1985), Scottish-Australian activist and politician
- Mary Stevenson (1922–1999), claimed author of "Footprints" (poem)
- Mary Ashley Stevenson (born 2005), American basketball player

== See also ==
- Mary Stevens
