= DC History Conference =

Annual community and academic conference

The DC History Conference is an annual community and academic conference for sharing historical research on Washington, D.C., supported by the Historical Society of Washington, D.C. The first conference was held in 1974.

== See also ==
- History of Washington, D.C.
