= Statue of Pierre Charles L'Enfant =

Statue in Washington, D.C., U.S.

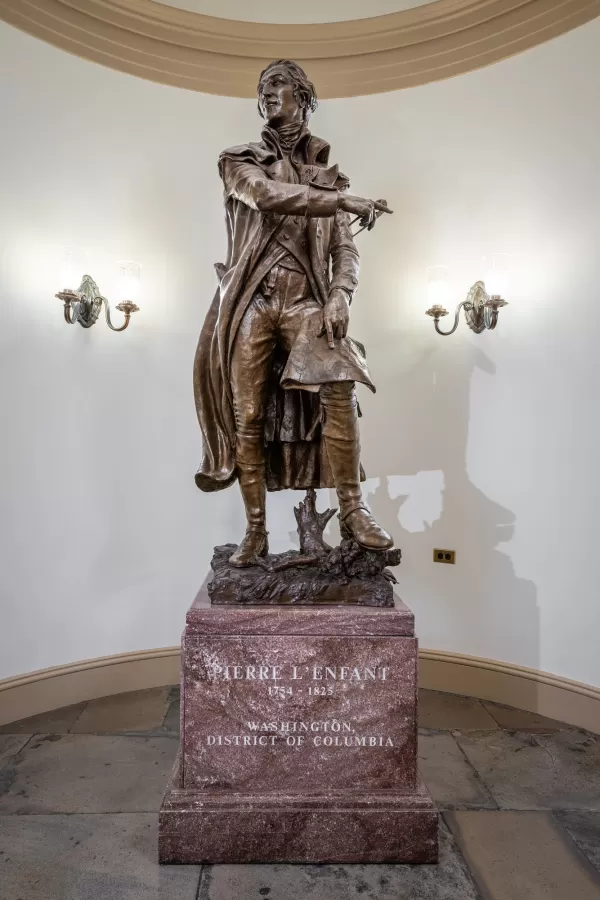
- Year: 2022
- Medium: Sculpture
- Subject: Pierre Charles L'Enfant
- Location: United States Capitol, Washington, D.C., U.S.

A statue of Pierre Charles L'Enfant is represented in the U.S. Capitol Building, Washington, D.C., L'Enfant was a French-American military engineer who designed the basic plan for Washington, D.C. known today as the L'Enfant Plan (1791). The Government of Washington, D.C. commissioned the statue in 2008 as part of the National Statuary Hall Collection with the statue unveiled as of February 2022.
