= Mary Stevens =

Mary Stevens may refer to:

- Mary Stevens, M.D., a 1933 American pre-Code drama film
- Mary Otis Stevens (born 1928), American architect
- Mary Stevens Beall (1854–1917), American historian, writer, and librarian
- Mary Stevens Park, a public park located in Norton, Stourbridge, West Midlands, England

== See also ==
- MaryAnne Stevens (born 1947), British art historian and curator
