= Mary Stevens Beall =

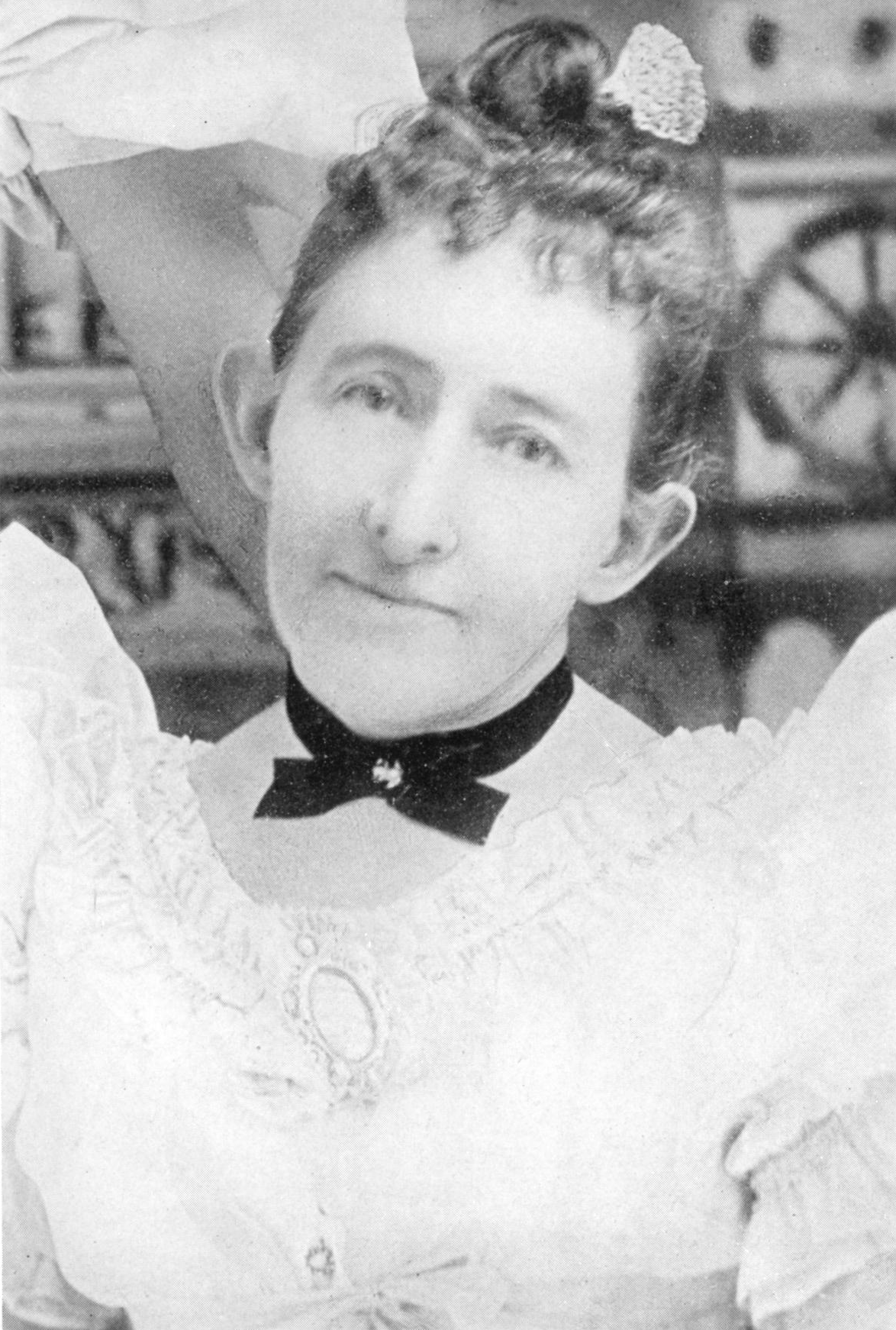
- (ca. 1902)
- Born: Mary Stevens; November 1, 1854; Philadelphia, Pennsylvania, U.S.
- Died: May 19, 1917 (aged 62); Washington, D.C., U.S.
- Education: Girls' High School and Normal School of Philadelphia
- Occupations: Historian; writer; librarian
- Spouse: Alexander Evans Beal (m. 1873; died 1910)
- Writing career
- Notable work: The Story Of The Washington Coachee And Of The Powel Coach which is Now at Mount Vernon

Mary Stevens Beall (November 1, 1854 – May 19, 1917) was an American historian who served as librarian and secretary of the Columbia Historical Society. In addition to The Story Of The Washington Coachee And Of The Powel Coach which is Now at Mount Vernon and Military and Private Secretaries of George Washington, she wrote essays, short stories, and magazine articles.

== Early life and education ==
Mary Stevens was born at No. 304 Union Street, Philadelphia, Pennsylvania, November 1, 1854. She was the only daughter of James Stevens, a prominent merchant, and Georgianna Gill Haines, his second wife. Beall had two half-sisters and a half brother. Her childhood was passed in the privacy of her home, her father having died suddenly of sunstroke in New Orleans when the child was ten years old. She followed with interest the varying incidents of the Civil War.

At the close of the war, Beall entered the Misses Bedlock's school which had been endowed by Benjamin Franklin. She graduated with honors and as valedictorian from the Girls' High School and Normal School of Philadelphia. Her literary convictions were formed while in school. Belles-lettres and history became her favorite studies. A copy of Shakespeare was usually found under her arm. She had a wide knowledge of French poets and could read them with ease in the original.

== Career ==
The following year, she was enrolled as a teacher at the State Normal School. When asked to chaperone one of her classes abroad, she promptly replied, "Never will I leave America. It is the flower of civilization."

She enjoyed a social life outside of Philadelphia in the long visits she paid during the summer months to relatives on the Eastern shore of Maryland. On the adjoining farm lived Alexander Evans Beall. He was a widower with three children. Beall was a direct descendant of Ninian Beall of Dunbartonshire, Scotland, who fought against Oliver Cromwell, was transported to Maryland and granted 795 acres of land, "Rock of Dumbarton," on which Georgetown was laid out a century later. The following winter, February 12, 1871, the wedding took place in the home church of the bride, in Philadelphia.

In the fall of 1881, her health became impaired and the following December, the family moved to Georgetown, taking up their residence on the historic part of "Gay" Street, later "N" Street. Here she enjoyed the company of literary society, including Dr. Joseph M. Toner, physician, writer and philanthropist; Dr. Samuel Clagett Busey; Charles Francis Adams, the historian, and Mrs. Adams; James M. Cutts, grandnephew of Dolly Madison; Matthew Gault Emery, mayor of Washington; John A. Kasson, minister to Austria-Hungary and Germany; and Rev. Dr. Byron Sunderland, the pastor of the First Presbyterian Church.

As a member of the Short Story Club, the Unity Club, and Potomac Club, she contributed numerous essays to each one. As the private secretary of Dr. Toner she became a close student of Washingtoniana, devoting a vast amount of time and labor to the study of the life of George Washington. It is said no two individuals were as familiar with the daily life of Washington as Mrs. Beall and Dr. Toner. Together they developed a comprehensive collection of the letters and writings of Washington, a task that had never before been accomplished. In 1892, this immense collection was deposited in the Library of Congress, proving to be of immense value to the historian.

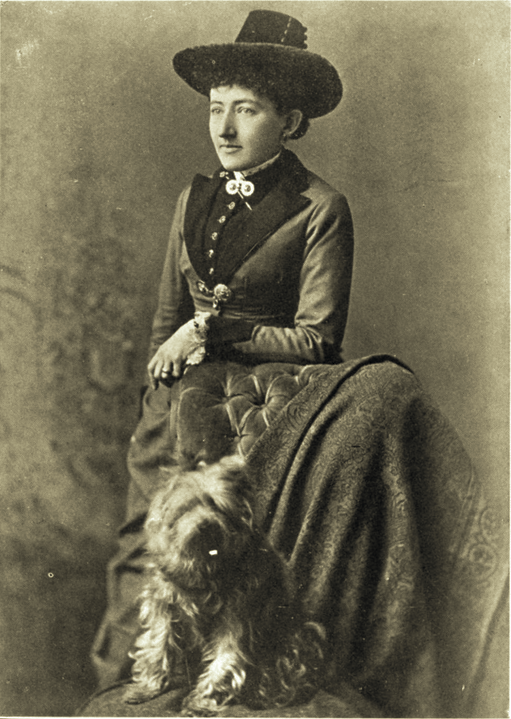
Mary Stevens Beall (ca. 1895)

Early in the winter of 1894, Dr. Toner conceived the idea of forming a historical society, not only for the preservation of data relating to the District but for sympathetic camaraderie. A meeting was called in the president's room of Columbian, later the George Washington University, March 9, "for the purpose of exchanging views as to the best methods of collecting and preserving data, relating to the District." April 12 another meeting was called and the Columbia Historical Society was formed. Into its limited membership came Mrs. Beall. Her courtly manners, varied interests, and literary knowledge made her a welcome member. January 5, 1895, she gave her first and only communication before the Society, "The Military and Private Secretaries of George Washington"; it was read before a membership of 40. On October 7, following the resignation of Doctor Marcus Baker, she was unanimously elected to fill out the unexpired term as Recording Secretary.

The second annual election of officers was held February 6, 1896, and Beall was reëlected recording secretary. She worked in the Society for more than 22 years. Her motive was inflexible, the ingathering of new members, not only residential but from different parts of the country.

Beall wanted a library for the Society. It grew slowly with Beall aiding and fostering its development, breaking down the bars of opposition. In March, 1910, the initial step was taken and a library comprehensive in scope and representative of the best literature was opened to the public. One section included the Society's publications, indexed and cataloged by her. In another, the collection of manuscript letters of the families of 1800, brought here by a permanent seat of government. In another, more than 1,000 unbound volumes and pamphlets, together with 50 maps. In another, the exchange volumes of other societies, together with relics of the Washington families. During her incumbency as librarian, she undertook on short notice the indexing of six folio volumes of the Letters and Speeches of Carl Schurz, edited by Doctor Frederic Bancroft, formerly Librarian of the State Department. The work was accomplished in a few months.

At the request of Robert L. Brownfield, Beall wrote a History of the Washington Coach over which a dispute had arisen as to whether the original coach had been destroyed; she proved conclusively it had been broken up and the original pieces sold as souvenirs. Her writing versatility was shown in the following works: The Merchant of Venice as Shakespeare Saw it Played; Talks on Early Art in Greece, Rome and Egypt, together with numerous short stories and magazine articles, such as a piece in Good Housekeeping (1903) on Beall's scheme for keeping notes about kitchen work.

She held classes each winter in the study of Shakespeare, and was a lecturer on "The Merchant of Venice as Shakespeare Saw It Played" and other Shakespearean subjects. She also prepared a series of art lectures covering the records from the earliest specimens of Egypt, Greece, and Rome, down to the Christian Era.

A few weeks before she died, Beall was unanimously elected recording secretary of the National Shakespeare Federation.

Beall was active in the institutional and charitable work of St. John's Episcopal Church, Georgetown.

== Personal life ==
Beall's paternal ancestors came from England and settled in Talbot County, Maryland, in 1652, the first, William Stevens, holding the office of King's justice. Her grandfather Stevens died when her father was 13 years old, and as soon as the latter attained his majority, he freed all the slaves he had inherited, and about ten years before the Civil War he gave US$10,000 to help build the ship Mary Caroline, for carrying freed slaves to Liberia and establishing them there. Her maternal ancestors came from Germany, the first, Peter Snyder, being one of the first settlers of Germantown, Philadelphia, Pennsylvania.

The Beall's made their home in a mansion situated in a grove of trees. In every room, there was a collection of pier-glass, antique mahogany, card tables, and candle stands. She had one child, a daughter, who, in later life, became Mrs. Thomas Hughes, residing in Georgetown. A grandson, Stevens Hughes, served in the U. S. Navy while another worked for American Security Trust Co.

The last day of activity, May 15, 1917, was spent in Georgetown in the company of Mrs. Cazenove Lee, arranging and pasting historical photographs into an album. Late in the day, Beall was stricken with apoplexy and hurried to a nearby hospital. In three days, she died.

== Selected works ==
- The Story Of The Washington Coachee And Of The Powel Coach which is Now at Mount Vernon, 1908 (text)
- Military and Private Secretaries of George Washington (Volume I, records of the Columbia Historical Society) (text)
