= Historical Society of Washington, D.C. =

Historical society in the United States

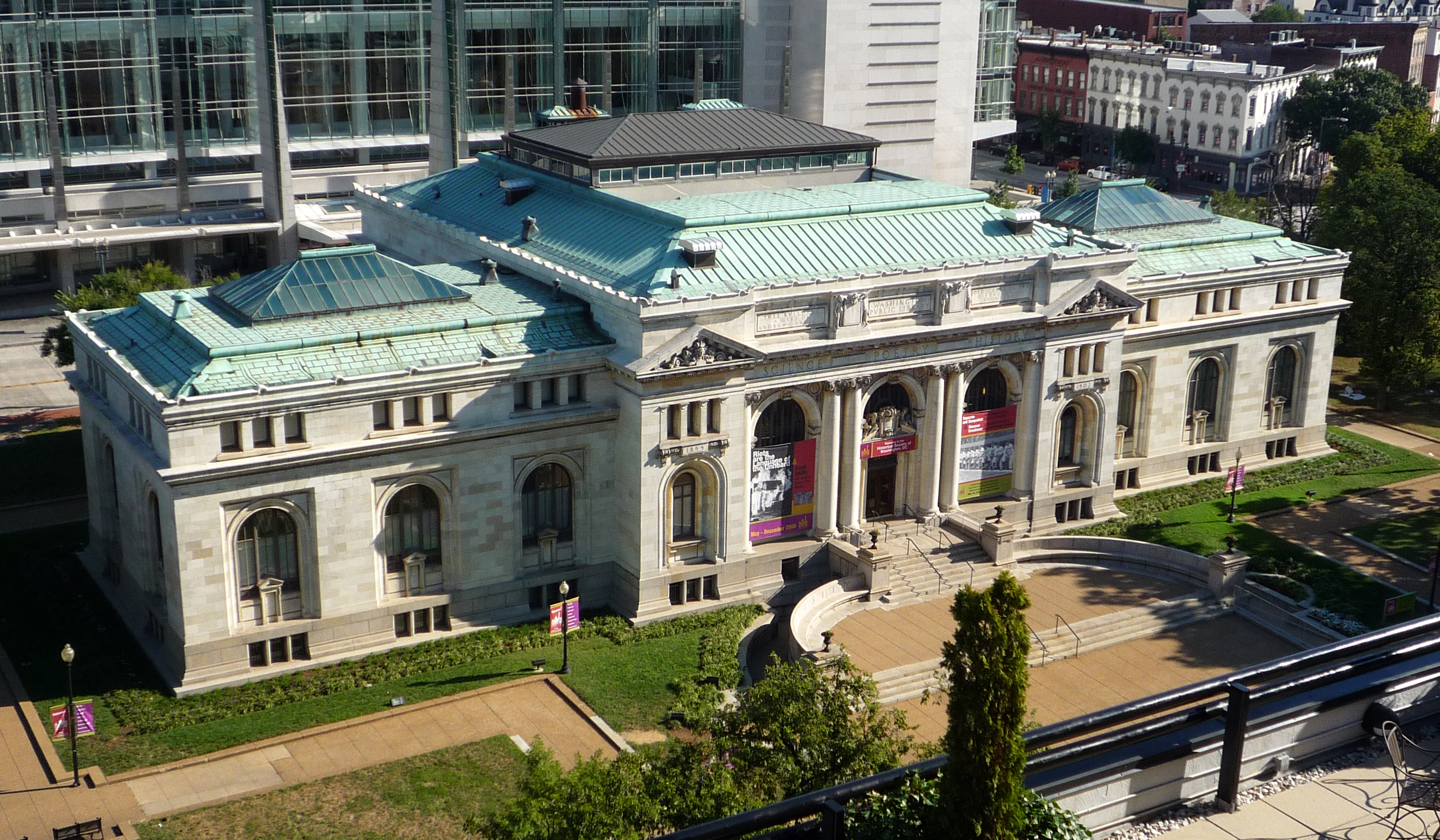
Carnegie Library building in Mount Vernon Square houses the Historical Society (2008)

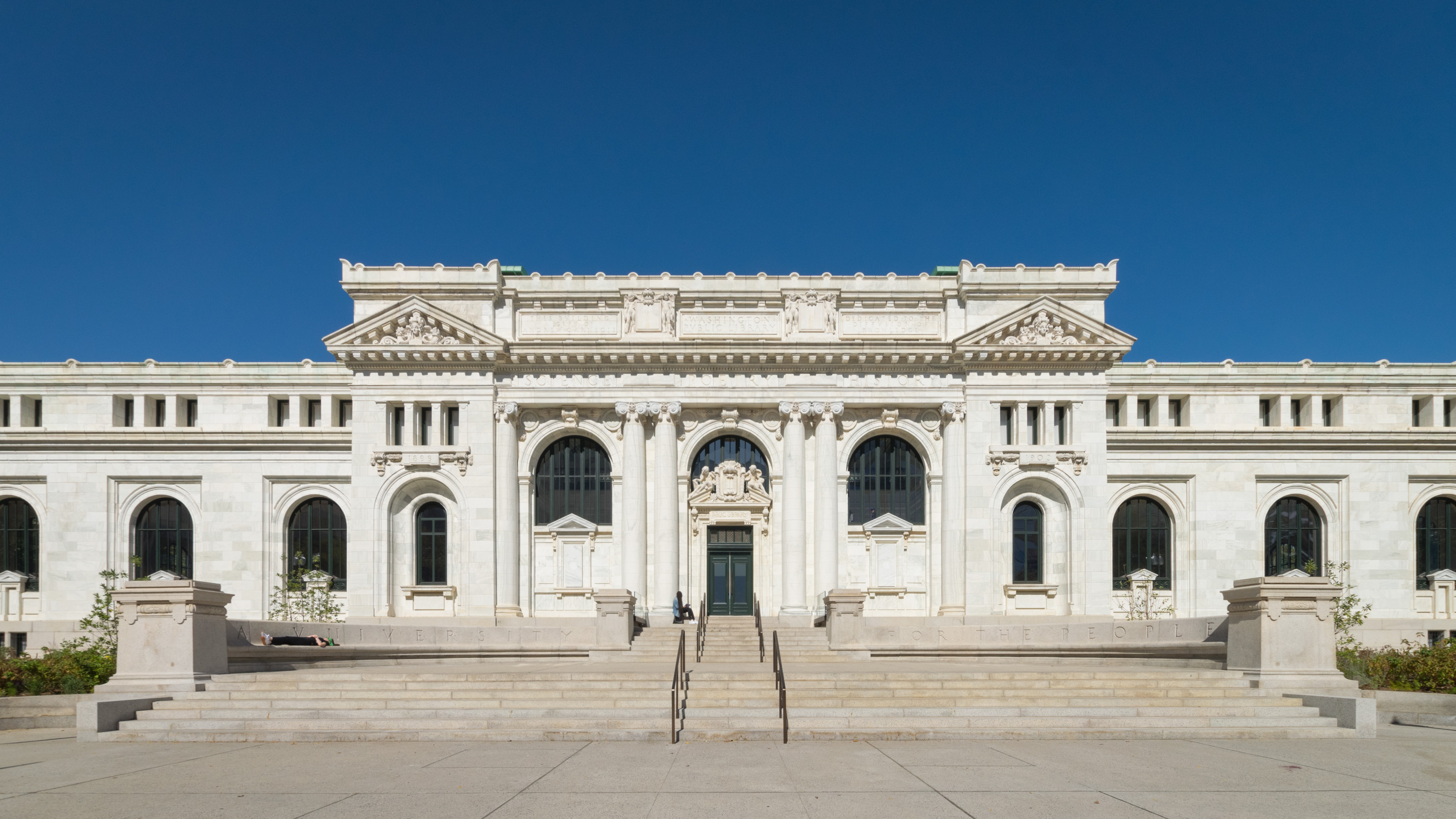
Carnegie Library building seen from the south in 2019

The Historical Society of Washington, D.C., also called the DC History Center, is an educational foundation dedicated to preserving and displaying the history of Washington, D.C. The society provides lectures, exhibits, classes, and community events. It runs a museum, library, and publishes the journal Washington History. It had been named The Columbia Historical Society from its founding in 1894 until 1988.

The society's home is the Carnegie Library of Washington D.C., a Beaux-Arts building in the center of Mount Vernon Square in Washington. It was built in 1902 to be District of Columbia Public Library, one of the many Carnegie libraries. The building is open to the public from Monday through Sunday 10am to 5pm. Visitors can tour the exhibits and use the society's Kiplinger Research Library, which has books, maps, photographs, and other materials relevant to the history of the city.

== Washington History ==
The society publishes a peer-reviewed academic journal Washington History, generally twice a year. The editorial board includes George Derek Musgrove, Chris Myers Asch, and Jane Freundel Levey.

The journal's predecessor was the original Records of the Columbia Historical Society, which was published from 1894 to 1989. In the society's early years, membership dues went largely to support the publication of the Records. These hard-bound volumes appeared every year until 1922, and thereafter every two or three years.

== History ==
The Columbia Historical Society was founded in 1894 by a group of 36 men and women, with the following mission: "Its objects shall be the collection, preservation, and diffusion of knowledge respecting the history and topography of the District of Columbia and national history and biography." The organization had as its goal "collecting the scattered and rapidly disappearing records of events and individuals prominent in the history of the city and District." The main role of the early society was to serve as a forum for members to present historical research, which was then published in the Records of the Columbia Historical Society. The organization also amassed library and manuscript collections.

By 1899, the new organization had 108 members. Of these, 95 were men, and 101 were residents of Northwest Washington. Although African Americans constituted one-third of the then-racially segregated city's population, the membership of the Columbia Historical Society was all white.

The growth of the collections presented difficulties. For more than 50 years, the society used rented and donated rooms to house its offices and library. Volunteers served as librarians and curators. In the late 1940s, a bill to finance reassembly of Francis Scott Key's home and give it to the society was passed by Congress, but President Harry Truman vetoed it for budgetary reasons. A professional appointed in 1947 promulgated a collecting policy and created the first catalog.

In 1954, the District of Columbia Public Library, which had been storing the society's collections, threatened to evict them because of its own space problems. The society's board of trustees appealed to the membership for a home. In 1955, Amelia Keyser Heurich, widow of prominent Washington brewer Christian Heurich, donated the family's four-story mansion near Dupont Circle, which became the society's headquarters. The society took possession of the mansion the following year after Mrs. Heurich died.

The society hired its first director in 1959, although the office of the board of trustees' president, Ulysses S. Grant III, who served from 1952 to 1968, still performed most of the society's work. For many years the house chairman lived on the third floor and rented offices in the building to other historical and patriotic organizations. Space was available for a library in the mansion, which housed the book, manuscript, photograph and other collections.

In 1975, a real estate transaction produced a significant endowment, which was used to hire the first full-time, professional historian as executive director, Perry Fisher. Fisher used the interest in the nation's past stimulated by the U.S. Bicentennial to increase the society's programs and membership.

In 1989, the society was renamed the Historical Society of Washington, D.C. and relaunched its magazine Records as the journal Washington History.

In 1998, Monica Scott Beckham, vice president of the society's board of trustees, went before a subcommittee of the U.S. House of Representatives Committee on Appropriations to seek federal funding for a City Museum of Washington, D.C. Congress appropriated $2 million in 1999 "provided that the District of Columbia shall lease the Carnegie Library at Mount Vernon Square to the Society ... for 99 years at $1 per year". On July 14, 1999, District Mayor Anthony A. Williams announced the creation of the City Museum of Washington, D.C. in the Carnegie Library. The City Museum opened in May 2003, but closed in November 2004 because of a lack of funding and interest.

In 2006, the society and the National Music Center entered into an agreement that permitted the Music Center to occupy a substantial portion of the Carnegie Library for three years.

The Carnegie Library houses the society's research library, rotating exhibits, and offices. Ninety percent of the society's historic collections, which include artworks, documents, maps, objects, and over 100,000 photographs, are stored on-site. A permanent exhibition, Window to Washington, now traces the development of the District's built environment and serves as an introduction to the society's collections. The society also provides research workshops to students and community groups, including D.C. Public Charter Schools and universities.

In 2017, the Historical Society moved to a temporary location to facilitate renovation of the Carnegie Library Building. The renovated building reopened on May 11, 2019. The Historical Society now shares space in the building with an Apple Store.

== Notable people ==
- Mary Stevens Beall (1854–1917), librarian and secretary of the Columbia Historical Society
