= Columbus Fountain =

Public artwork in Washington, DC

- Artist: Lorado Taft
- Year: 1912
- Type: Marble
- Dimensions: 14 m × 20 m × 13 m (45 ft × 66 ft × 44 ft)
- Condition: Inoperable static display
- Union Station Plaza and Columbus Fountain
- U.S. National Register of Historic Places
- Location within Central Washington, D.C. Location within the District of Columbia Location within the United States
- Coordinates: 38°53′47.04″N 77°0′23.76″W
- NRHP reference No.: 80004523
- Added to NRHP: April 09, 1980
- Location: Washington, D.C., United States; 38°53′47.04″N 77°0′23.76″W
- Owner: National Park Service

Columbus Fountain, also known as the Columbus Memorial, is a public artwork by American sculptor Lorado Taft, located at Union Station in Washington, D.C., United States. A centerpiece of Columbus Circle, Columbus Fountain serves as a tribute to the Italian explorer Christopher Columbus. The unveiling in 1912 was celebrated all over Washington, DC over the course of three days with parades, concerts and fireworks gathering tens of thousands of people from all over the world.

== Description ==
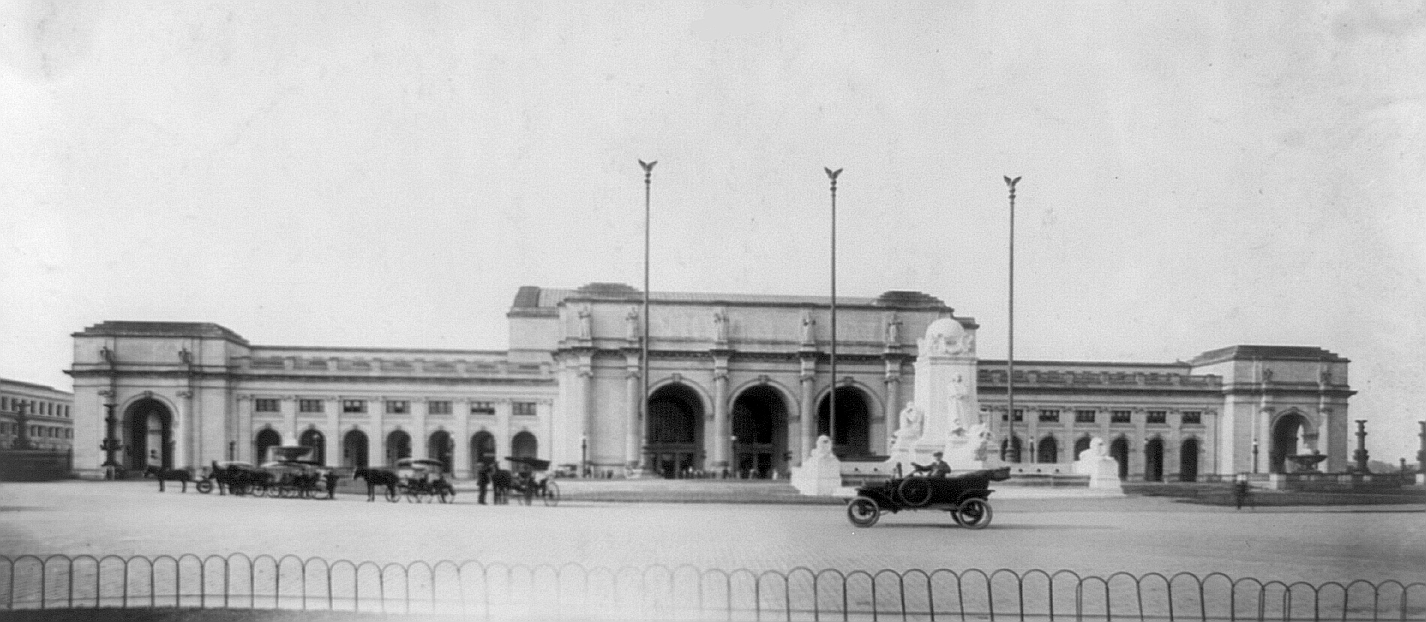
Columbus Circle with Union Station in the early 20th century

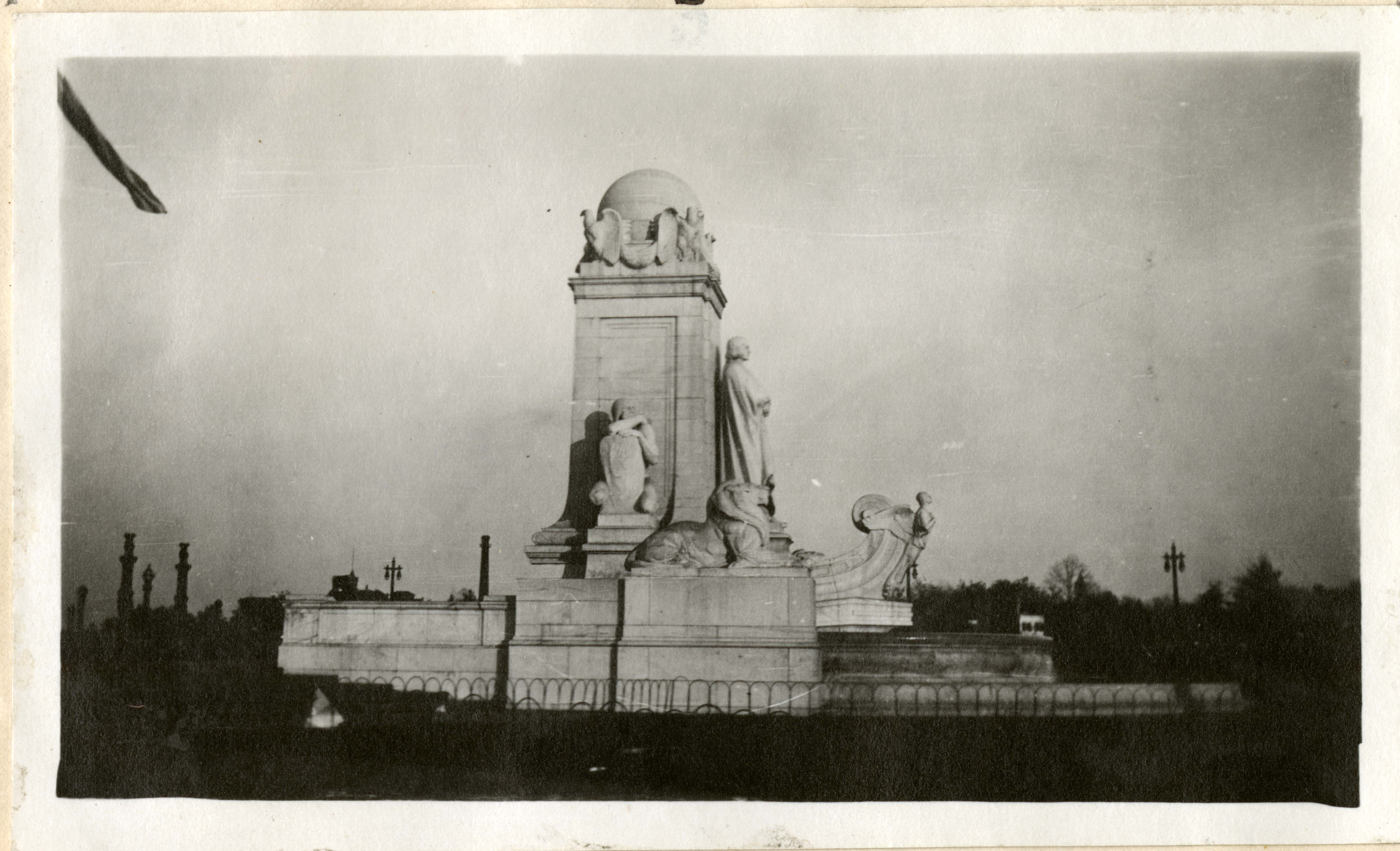
The Columbus Fountain in 1919

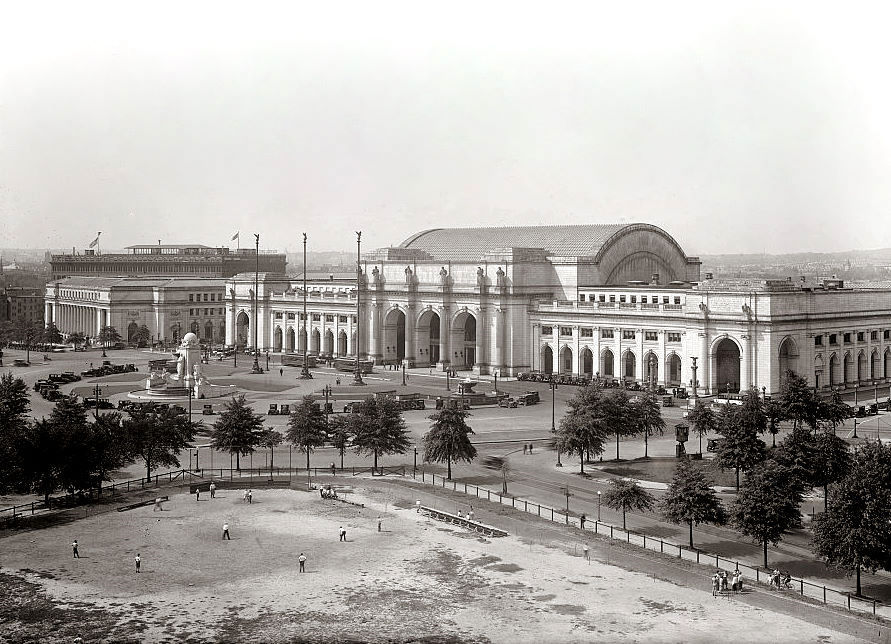
View from the Capitol of the Fountain in 1925

Columbus Fountain is a semicircular double-basin fountain with a 45-foot-tall shaft (14 m) in the center. The front of the shaft bears a full-length portrait of Christopher Columbus (approx. h. 15 ft.) wearing a mantle, staring forward with his hands folded in front of him. Beneath him is a ship prow that features a winged figurehead that represents the observation of discovery. A globe, representing the Western Hemisphere, is on top of the shaft with four eagles on each corner connected by garland. The left and right sides of the shaft have two male figures decorating them. The right side figure has an elderly man, representing the Old World, and the left side has a figure of a Native American, representing the New World. The back of the shaft has a low-relief medallion (approx. d. 3 ft.) with images of Ferdinand & Isabella. Two lions (approx. h. 5 ft.), placed away from the base, guard the left and right sides of the fountain.

The back of the shaft is inscribed:

TO
THE MEMORY OF
CHRISTOPHER COLUMBUS
WHOSE HIGH FAITH
AND
INDOMITABLE COURAGE
GAVE TO MANKIND
A NEW WORLD
BORN MCDXXXVI
DIED MDIV

The fountain sits in the center of the Columbus traffic circle in front of Union Station.

== Congressional legislation ==
1906 vision for Union Station

A very different fountain was originally planned for the circle in front of Union Station. But lobbying began in 1906 for a memorial by the Knights of Columbus. The location was not specified at the time.

On March 4, 1907, at 11:00 am, the 59th United States Congress approved HR 13304: That there shall be erected in the city of Washington, in the District of Columbia, a suitable memorial to the memory of Christopher Columbus.

Section 2 provided that a Commission shall be created consisting of:

- the chairman of the Senate committee on the Library of the Fifty-ninth Congress
- the chairman of the Committee on the Library of the House of Representatives of the Fifty-ninth Congress
- the Secretary of State (Elihu Root)
- the Secretary of War (William H. Taft)
- the Supreme Knight of the Order of the Knights of Columbus

The powers of the commission would include the full authority to select a site and a suitable design and to contract for and superintend the construction of [the] said memorial.

Section 3 provided the Commission $100,000 from the Treasury of the United States not otherwise appropriated.

== Designing the fountain ==
In May 1907, a commission was formed for the memorial fountain headed by prominent members of the Senate, Secretary of State Elihu Root and Secretary of War William H. Taft (who was elected President of the United-States the following year) which served as committee chairman. Upon agreeing on the location for the fountain, a call for designs was requested by artists from America, Italy and Spain. The reason for the three countries stemmed from the committee idea that "if it should be from the hand of an American, the land which Columbus gave to the world; from an Italian, the land which gave Columbus to the world, or from Spain, the land which made Columbus's achievement possible."

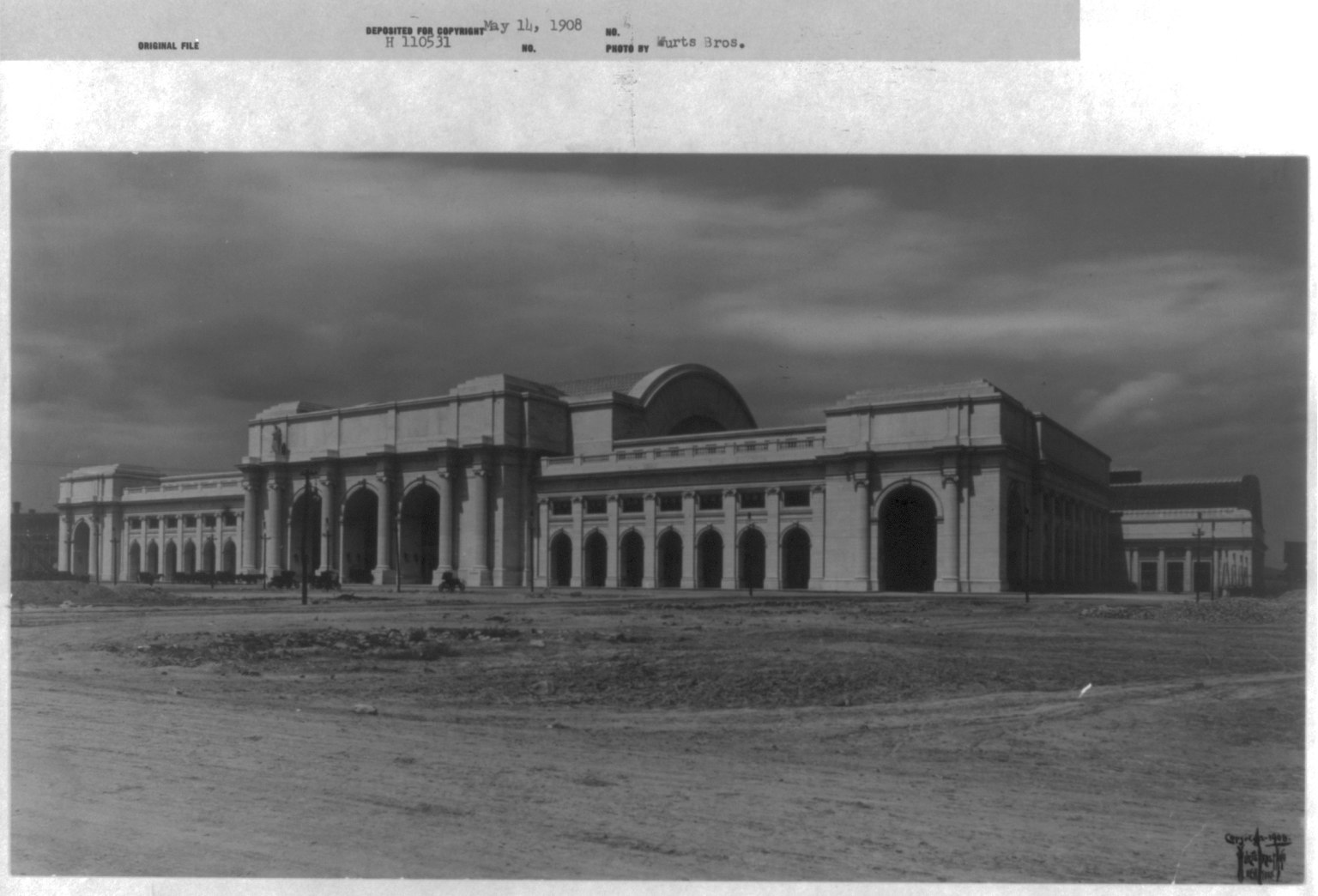
Union Station in 1908 prior to the installation of the fountain

On March 20, 1908, details of the general scheme proposed by architect Daniel Burnham was approved by the commission. The Evening Star enumerates the exacts details of the design:
The fountain will be placed directly in front of Union station at the juncture of Delaware and Massachusetts avenues. It will be semi-circular in form, with an inner and an outer basin, having an extreme width of 64 feet.

A stone column or shaft about 10 feet in height, surmounted with a globe representing the world, is the principal feature of the rear of the fountain and is intended to serve as a background for statue of Columbus standing at the bow of a Spanish caravel similar in general design to the picturesque craft that first brought him to America. The uprearing prow of the ship, with its figure of Columbus, stands on the line of Delaware Avenue and faces the National Capitol. Two recumbent lions are placed on the walls of the fountain, one at the east and the other at the west side and there are other architectural and artistic details embodied in the general scheme.

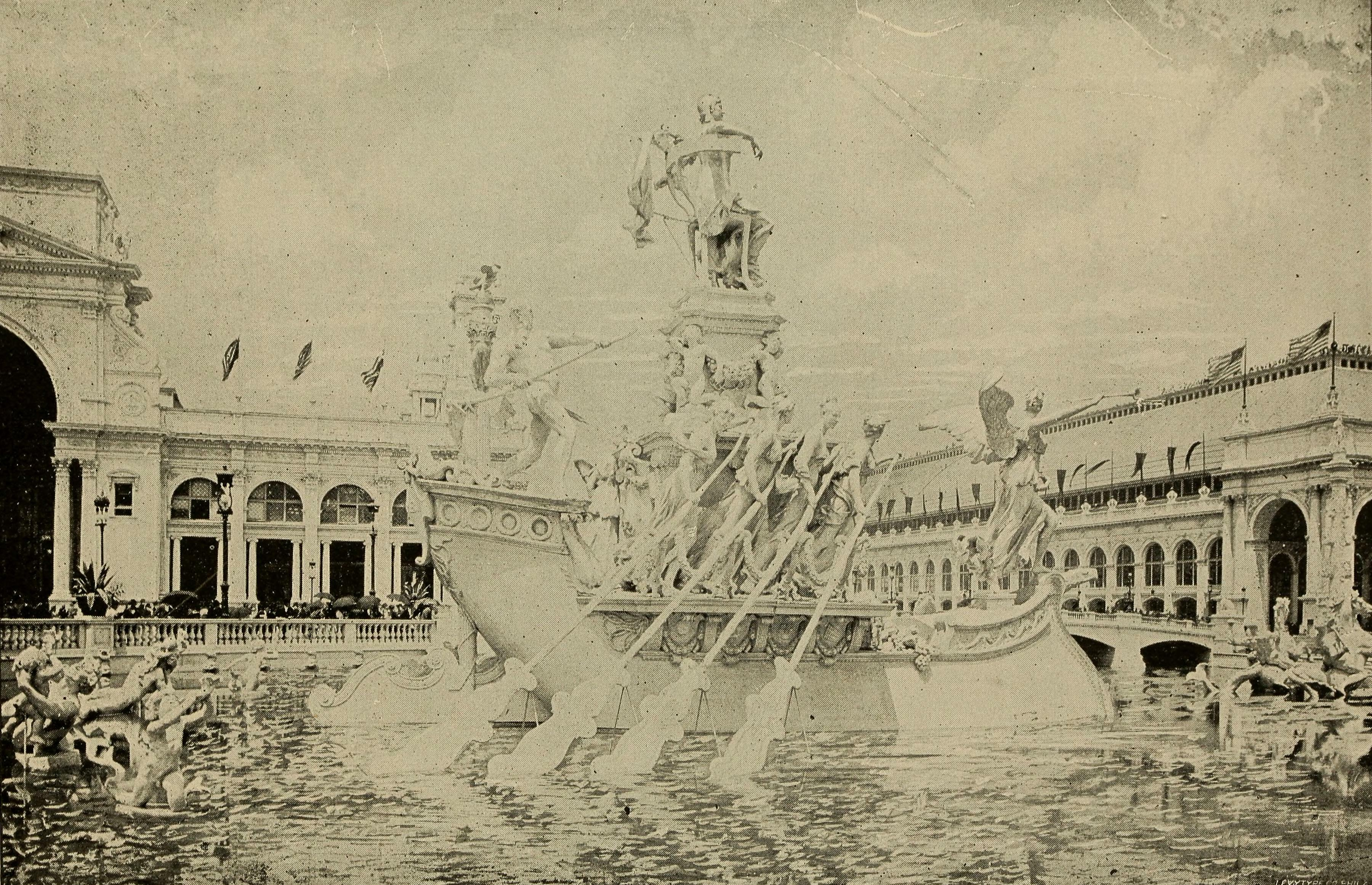
The Columbian Fountain, Chicago, 1893

It was influenced by a fountain designed by Frederick MacMonnies that was displayed at the World's Columbian Exposition in Chicago in 1893. This work depicted a figure of Columbia sitting on a ship with a figure of Fame standing on a ship prow holding a trumpet and a representational figure of Time dominating the stern.

Six sculptors, in particular, were to be invited to this competition by the committee:

- For Spain: Augustin Querol
- For Italy: Augustus Revolta and Cesare Zoccni
- For the United States: Frederick W. MacMonnies, Daniel C. French and Lorado Taft (a distant cousin of the Committee Chairman in the Taft family).

The competition was to remain open to other sculptors and all submissions were to be sent by the committee before or on December 1, 1908. The second and third best designers would get $500 each while the first prize would receive $20,000. Frederick W. MacMonnies and Daniel C. French informed the Committee they would be unable to participate as they had other engagements at the time. In all, twenty sculptors submitted proposals for the fountain including: Henri Cronier, Philip Martiny, Charles Keck, Augustus Lukeman, Alfred Sauder, Henry Hering, Charles J. Pike, Pierre Feitu, Leo Lentelli, John C. Hardy, John K. Daniels, Hans Schuler, Giuseppi Donato, J. Otto Schweizer, V.R. Hoxie, Augustin Querol, Louis Weingartner and Lorado Taft.

The competition model probably submitted in 1908 by Lorado Taft

The models received were put on display in December 1908 in the fifth-floor corridor of the State, War and Navy Departement Building. They were screened until the committee was ready to review all the proposals. The identities of the artists who had responded were also withheld from the public. By that time, the committee was composed of Senator George P. Wetmore of Rhode Island, James McCleary of Minnesota, Secretary of State Elihu Root, Secretary of War Luke E. Wright, and Edward L. Hearn, Supreme Knight of the Order of the Knights of Columbus. W. R. Pedigo was the secretary and Col. Charles S. Broniwell. US Army was the executive and disbursing officer. William H. Taft was no longer on the committee as he had resigned as Secretary of War on June 30 to devote himself to his campaign to become the 27th President of the United States.

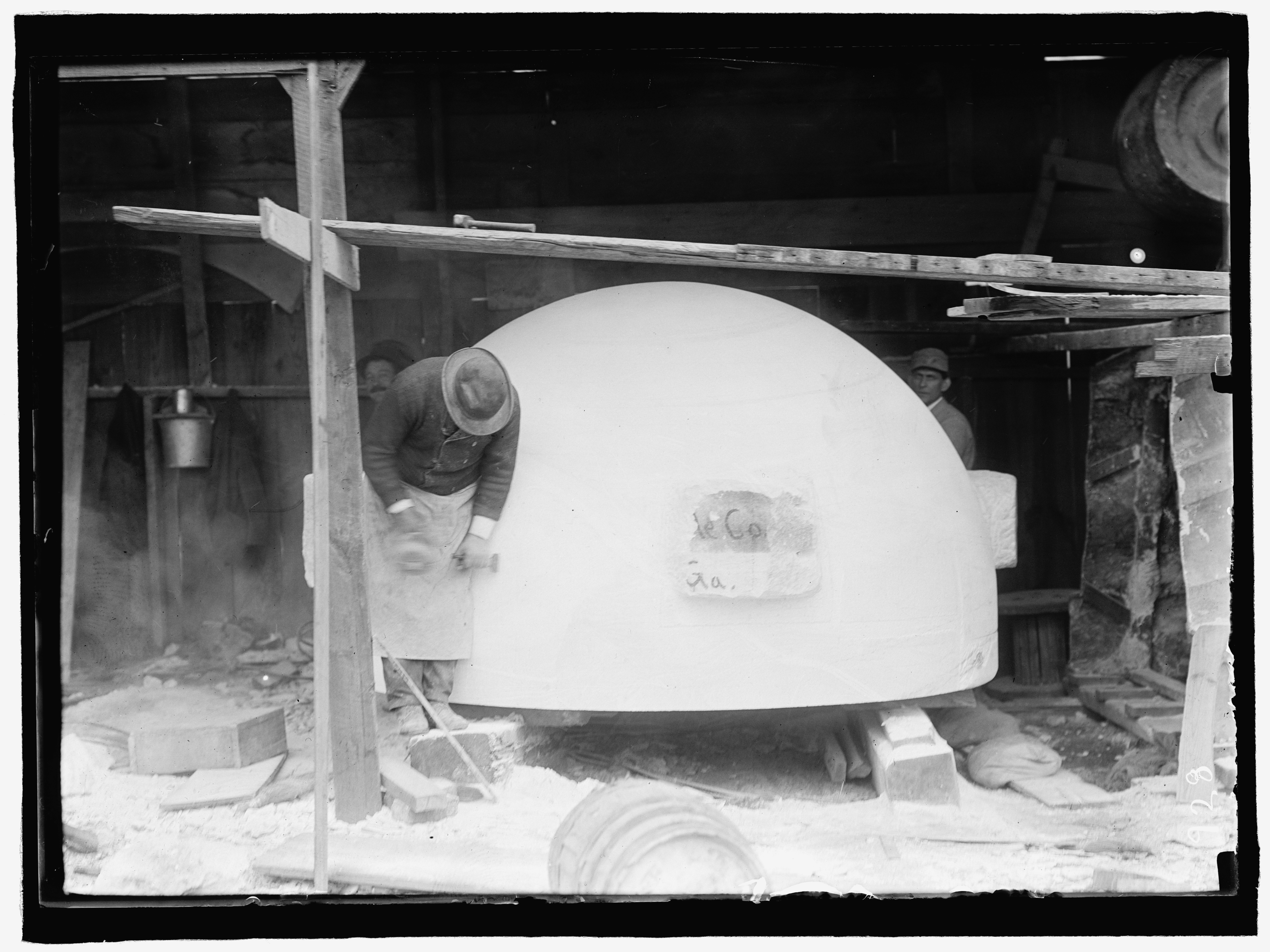
Carving of the top of the world globe with protruding anchors left on the sides of the block to lift it into place

On February 13, 1909, it was decided that the public would be able to view the models prior to the determination of the winner. The reception of the models by the press was poor. The main complaint was with the committee and not the artists. The artists had very limited artistic freedom considering the very precise parameters given by the committee to be incorporated in the fountain and it was admirable that they had been able to provide so many different expressions to the status of Christopher Columbus.

On February 27, 1909, the committee announced the winner of the competition. Lorado Taft was awarded the honor of making the statue of Columbus as well as all the other sculptures surrounding it and $20,000. The second place was given to Philip Martigny and the third place to Augustin Quero, each receiving $500. The remaining of the funds allocated to this project ($79,000) were to be used to provide all the materials (bronze and granite) as well as the labor for carvings, casting, transportation to the site and setting the memorial in place. The newspapers did not fail to mention that the winner was a cousin of President-elect William H. Taft.

Bids for the construction of the fountain and base were open from June 20, 1911, to July 28, 1911. The ad called for "sealed proposals for stonework (granite or marble) for foundations, concrete piles, masonry, etc., and for plumbing and sewers" to be submitted to the committee before midnight on July 28, 1911. The envelopes would be opened publicly. The ad ran in local newspapers from June 26, 1911, to June 29, 1911, as well as on July 24 and 25, 1911. The contract was awarded to J. C. Richardson & Son of New York. The bid was for $21,854 for everything excluding the carvings.

Architect Edward Wilmann of D. H. Burnham & Company was put in charge of the construction of the piece.

== Installation and dedication ==
On October 31, 1911, construction, which was supervised by A. W. Taylor of J.C. Robinson & Son, began and the piece was installed from March–June 1912.

There was great excitement in anticipation of the upcoming unveiling. A committee was formed to organize the celebration with various subcommittees to organize the various events organized for Friday, June 7, 1912, through Sunday, June 9, 1912.

=== Friday, June 7 ===
Friday, June 7, Knights of Columbus from around the world gathered in Washington. They visited the tomb of George Washington at Mount Vernon. An ad published in the Washington Herald and Washington Times on June 7 indicates that the Washington-Virginia Electric Railway was the "Official Route" of the Knight of Columbus to Mount Vernon leaving from 12th Street and Pennsylvania Ave.

From 7:30 to 10:30 pm, a public reception was held at the new National Museum (now known as the National Museum of Natural History) which opened the previous year with music played by the United States Marine Band and the presence of the Columbus Memorial commission. 4,000 people attended the event with music and a ball. Among the dignitaries present were DC Commissioner Cuno Hugo Rudolph, Senator Henry F. Ashurst of Arizona and Judge William H. De Lacy of the Juvenile Court.

At the same time, an Automobile pageant was taking place near the White House with 50,000 people lining up on both sides. Participating vehicles gathered at The Ellipse starting at 7:00 pm. The parade moved at 7:30 pm following a predetermined route: Pass between the Treasury Department and the White House to H Street NW; west to 16th Street NW; north to Scott Circle; around the circle back on 16th Street NW to H Street NW; west to 17th Street NW; south to Pennsylvania Avenue NW; east to Executive Avenue NW; south between White House and State, War and Navy Building; back of White House to Pennsylvania Avenue NW; east to the Peace Monument; back over Pennsylvania Avenue NW to the White Lot.

=== Saturday, June 8 ===
The Knights of Columbus headed up the dedication ceremony on June 8, 1912. It was estimated that at least 150,000 people were expected to attend the opening. Congress supplied an extra $6,000 for expanded police security, with the Knights requesting at least 500 officers to participate. $10,000 was contributed by the Knights of Columbus for the event decorations, supplies and general planning.

A parade was planned starting at 3:00 pm featuring an estimated 50,000 participants for the civic portion. General Robert K. Evans, Chief of Military Affairs, served as the parade marshal, riding at the front of the parade. He was followed by the Army Contingent composed of the following (in order):

- Battalion of the US Engineers (Washington Barracks)
- Battalion of the Coast Artillery Corps (Art. Dist. of Potomac)
- Squadron of the Fifteenth Cavalry (Fort Myer)
- Battalion of the Third Field Artillery (fort Myer)

This was followed by the Navy and Marines with each its own band playing. The civic portion of the parade was composed of Knights of Columbus members from all over the country. The Civic portion went in the following order:

- All Fourth degree Knights
- New York and New Jersey Knights
- Pennsylvania Knights
- Maryland and District of Columbia Knights
- Virginia, West Virginia and all southern Knights
- Illinois, Ohio and all western Knights. The North Dakota delegation brought Ignatius Court from the Devils Lake Sioux Tribe in complete wardress.
- All other organizations (including several Italian societies)

Five Parade floats depicting Christopher Columbus' trials and tribulations followed behind. The floats included:

- "Reception of Columbus" by King Ferdinand (Massachusetts delegation)
- "Columbus before the King" (New York delegation)
- The "Departure of Columbus" from Europe (Pennsylvania delegation)
- The caravel in which Columbus set sail (The United Italian Society of Washington)
- The landing (District of Columbia knights)
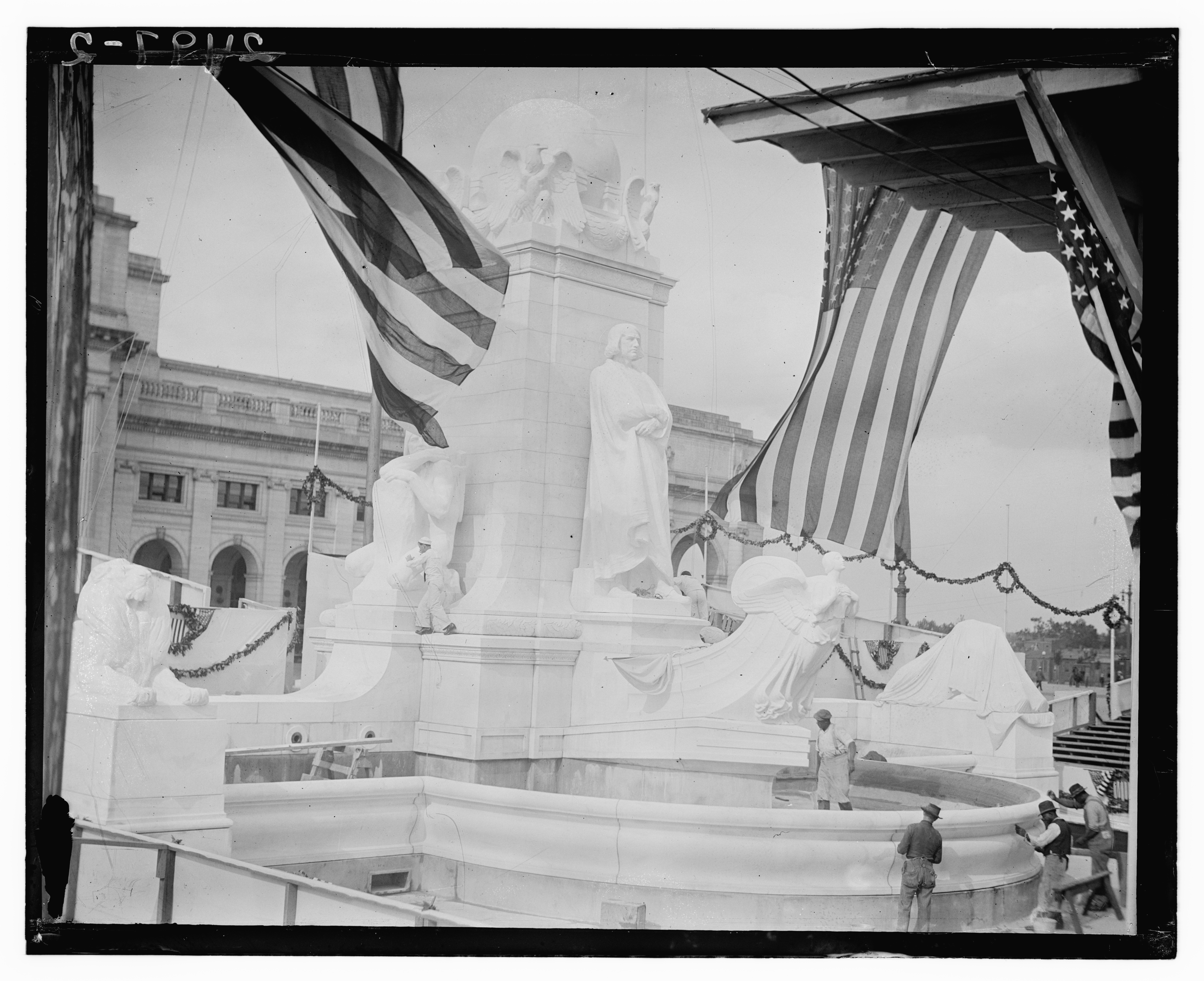
Columbus Memorial being prepped for its unveiling

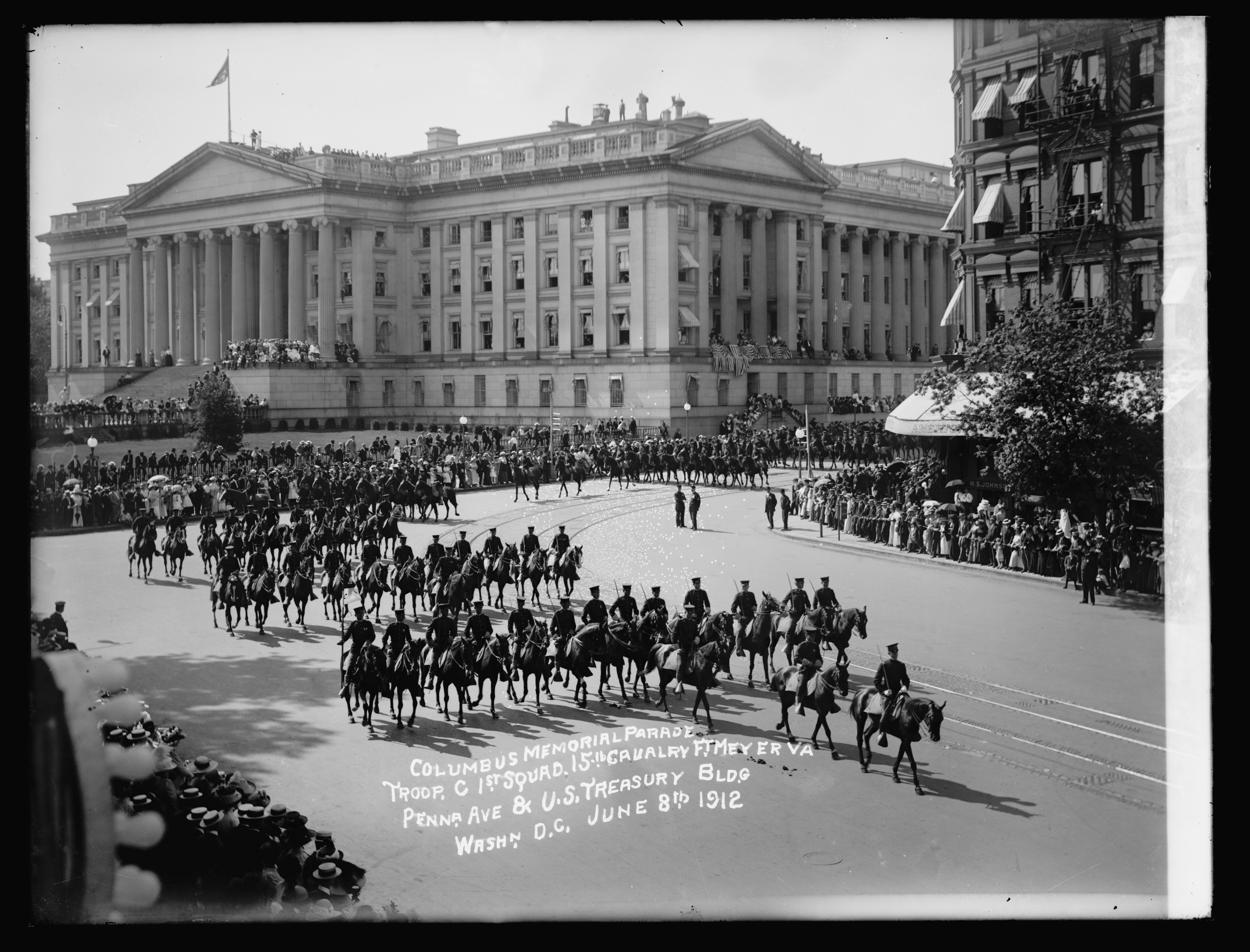
Troop C, 1st Squad, 15th Cavalry from Fort Myer, VA on Pennsylvania Avenue NW by the US Treasury Building

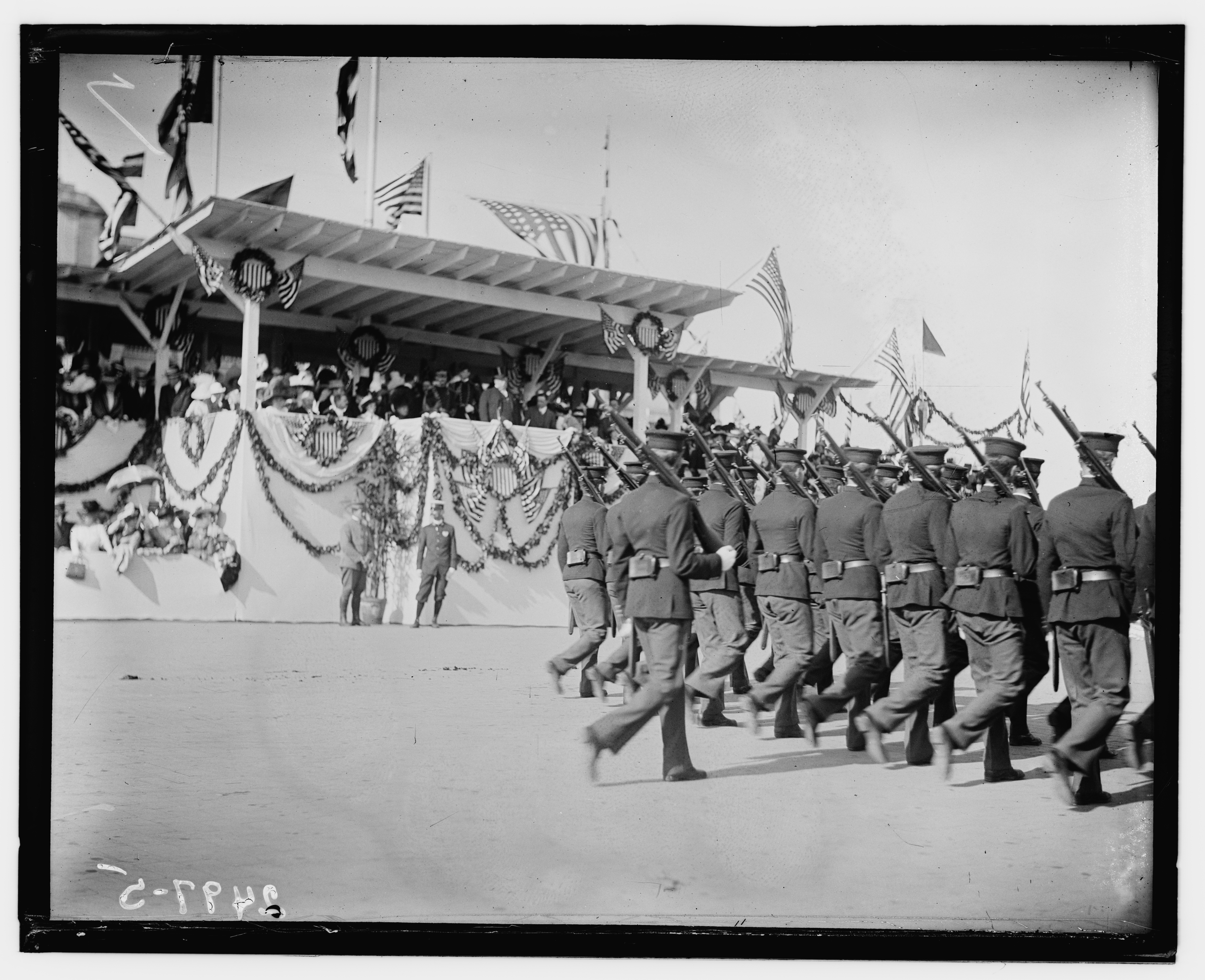
President Taft reviewing the troops in front of Union Station

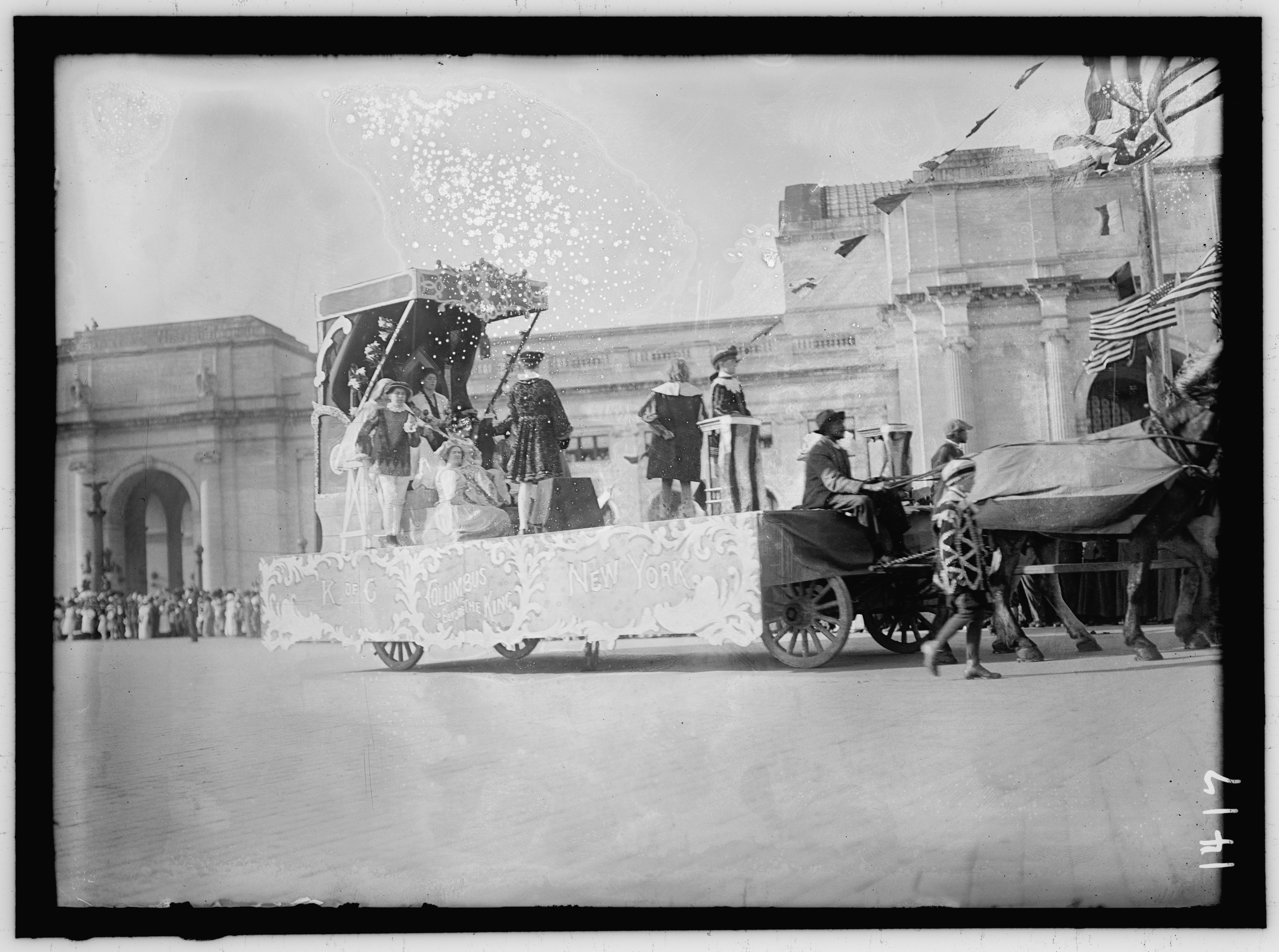
The "Columbus before the King" Float

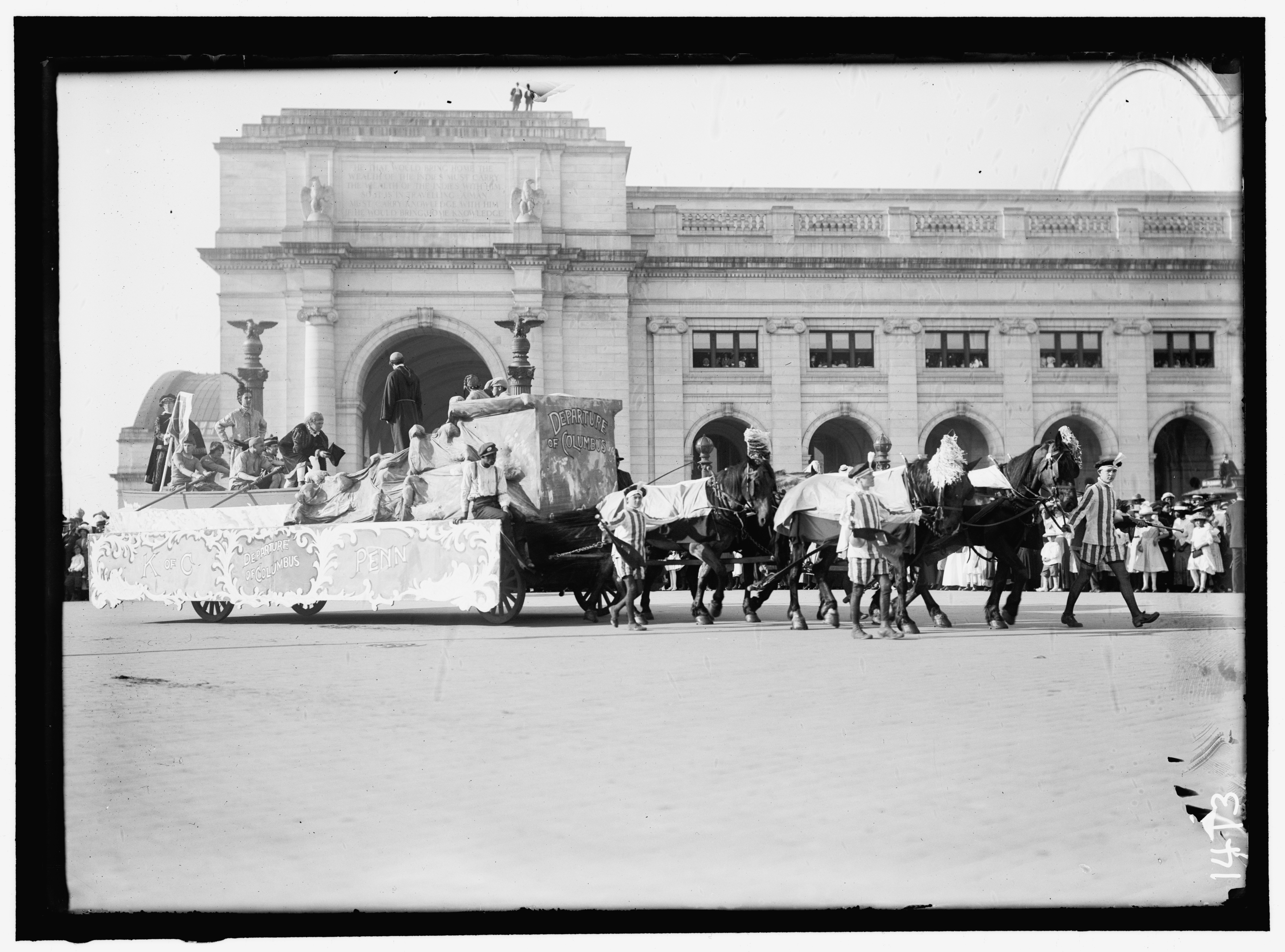
The "Departure of Columbus" Float

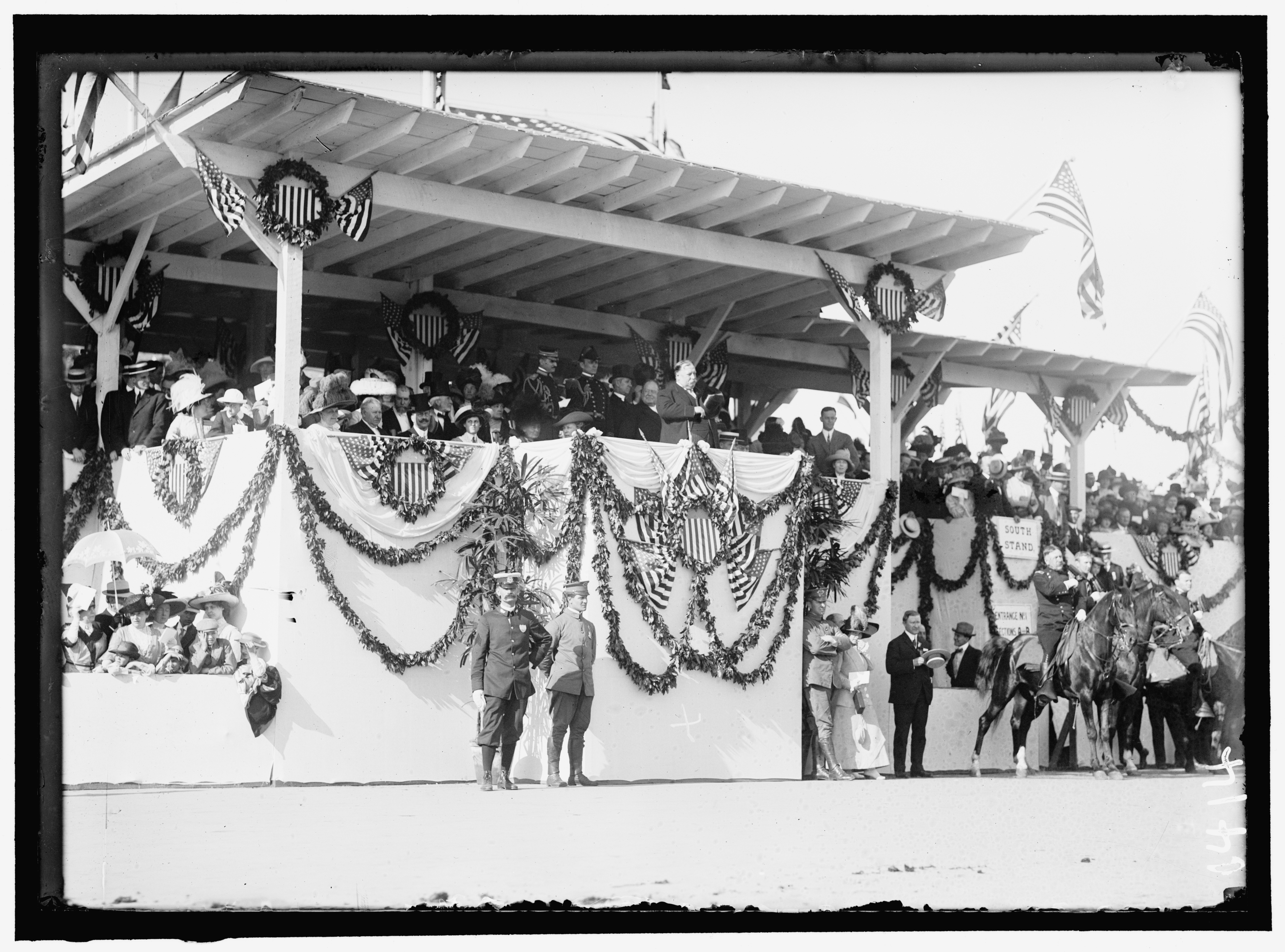
President Taft speaking from the stand

The route of parade was as follow: Pennsylvania Avenue NW to 2nd Street NW; north on 2nd Street NW to F Street NW; on F street NW to Massachusetts Avenue NW. This is where the reviewing stand stood, where President Taft and his guests reviewed the parade on Union Station Plaza. From Massachusetts Avenue to Stanton Square (later known Stanton Park) where the parade was reviewed by the Knights of Columbus.

The unveiling of the artwork was done on a beautiful sunny day with thousands of citizens and visitors attending the ceremony. Secretary of State Philander Knox was the presiding officer. The ceremony followed this order. An invocation was given by Mgr. Thomas Shahan, the Rector of the Catholic University of America. It was followed by an address from Chief Justice Victor J. Dowling. The Marine Band played. Representative James McCreary, a member of the original Committee, talked about the significance of Christopher Columbus. Marquis Luigi Cusani-Confalonieri, Italian Ambassador to the United States pulled the cords after some remarks. As the Stars and Stripes fell away from the statue, a battery from the 3rd Field Artillery from Fort Myer fired a 21-gun salute. Wreaths were laid by several officials and organizations. President Taft provided the formal address followed by a selection of pieces performed by the Marine Band. All the ushers at the ceremony were all members of the Sons of the American Revolution.

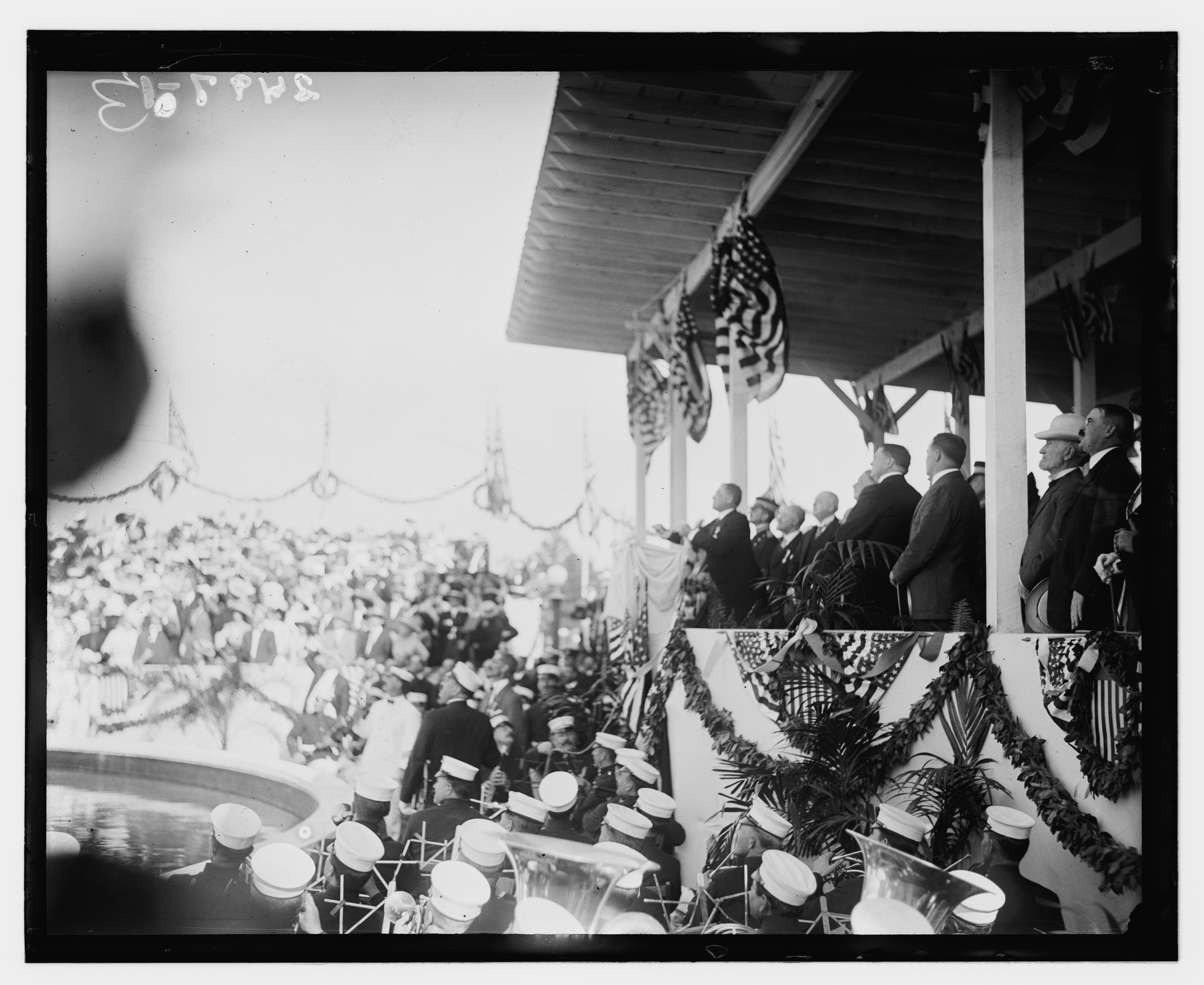
Ambassador Cusani-Confalonieri pulling the cord

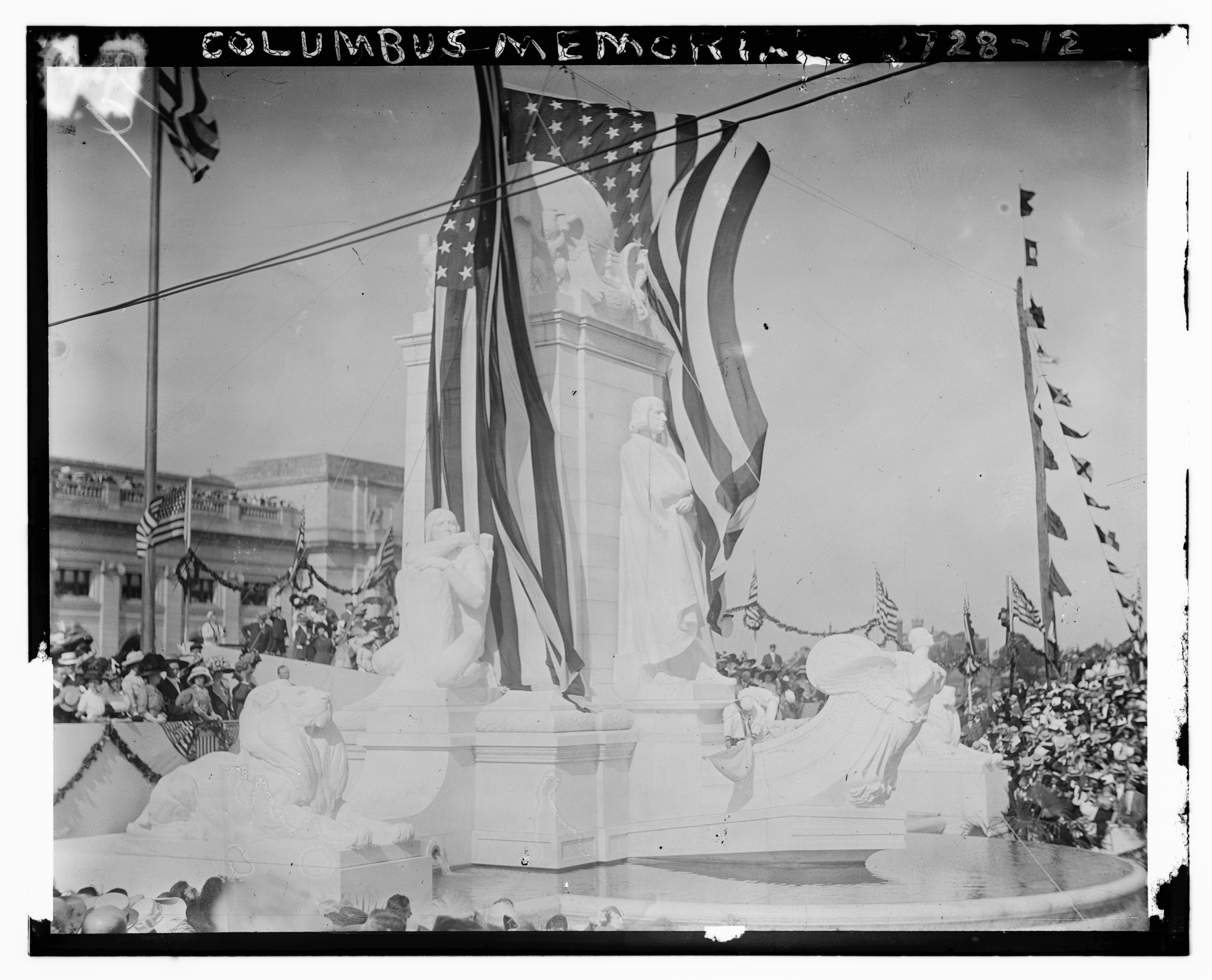
The Columbus Memorial surrounded by its veil

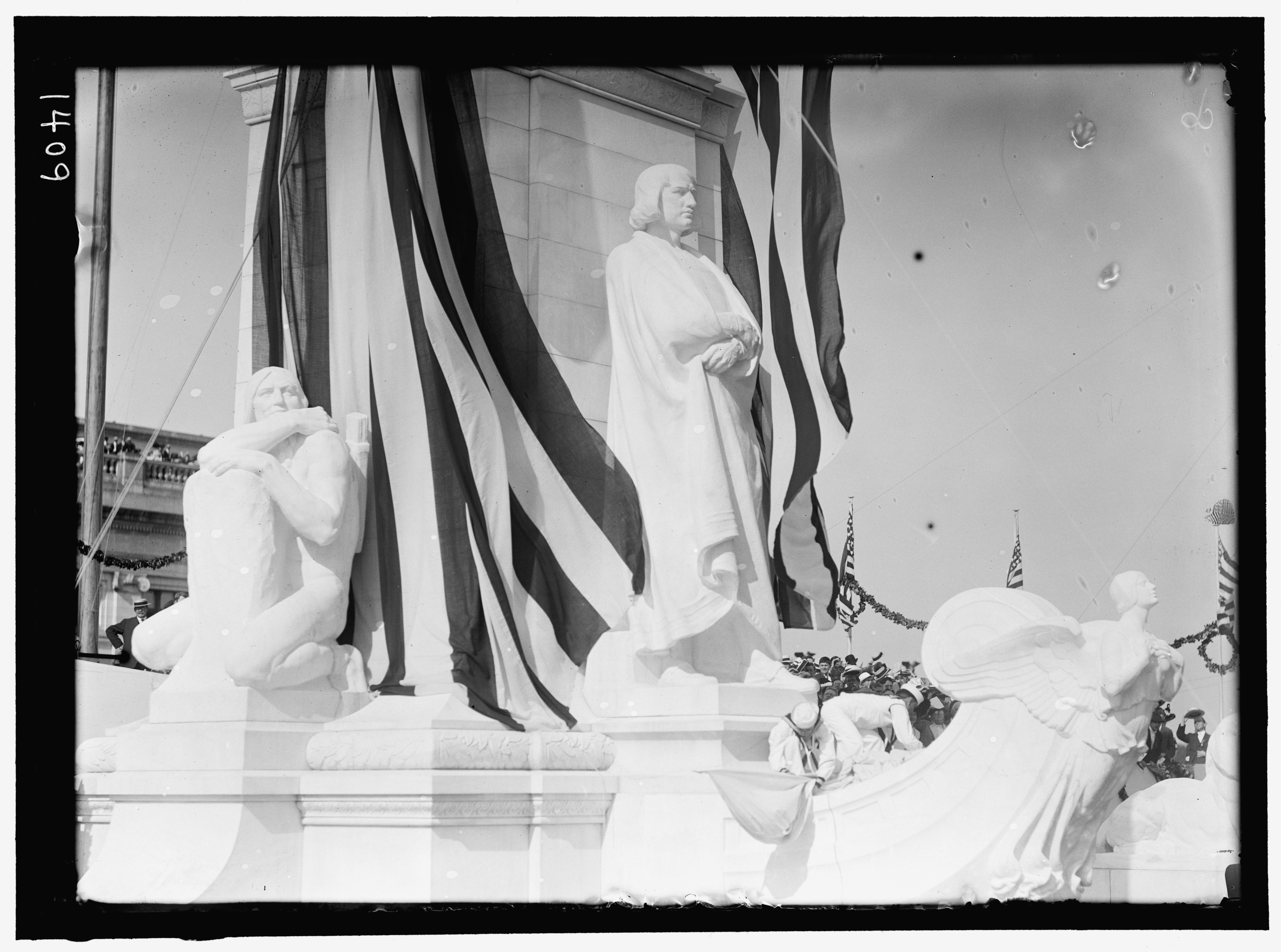
Close-up of the statue of Columbus still surrounded by the Stars and Stripes veil

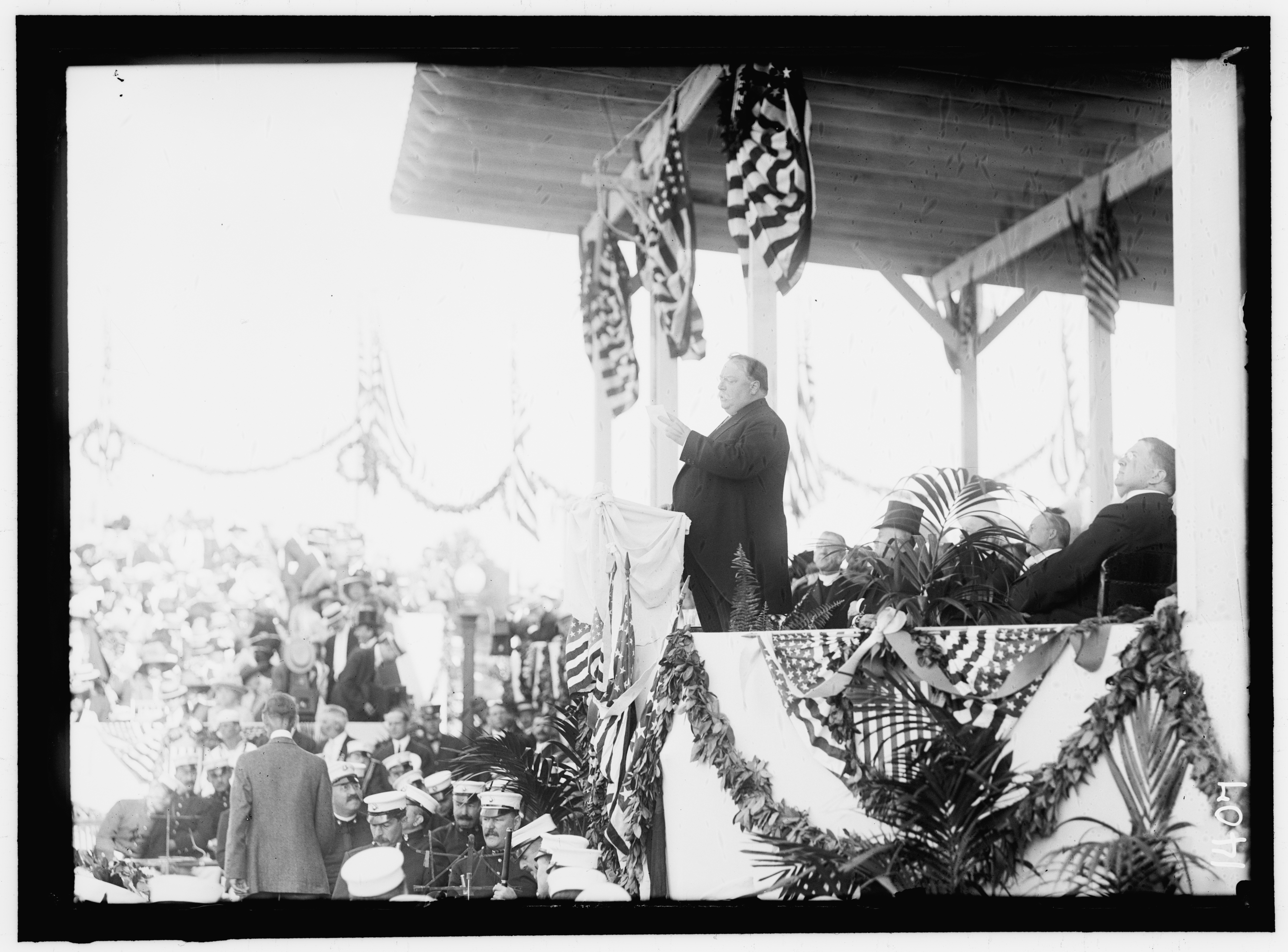
President Taft speaking at the unveiling

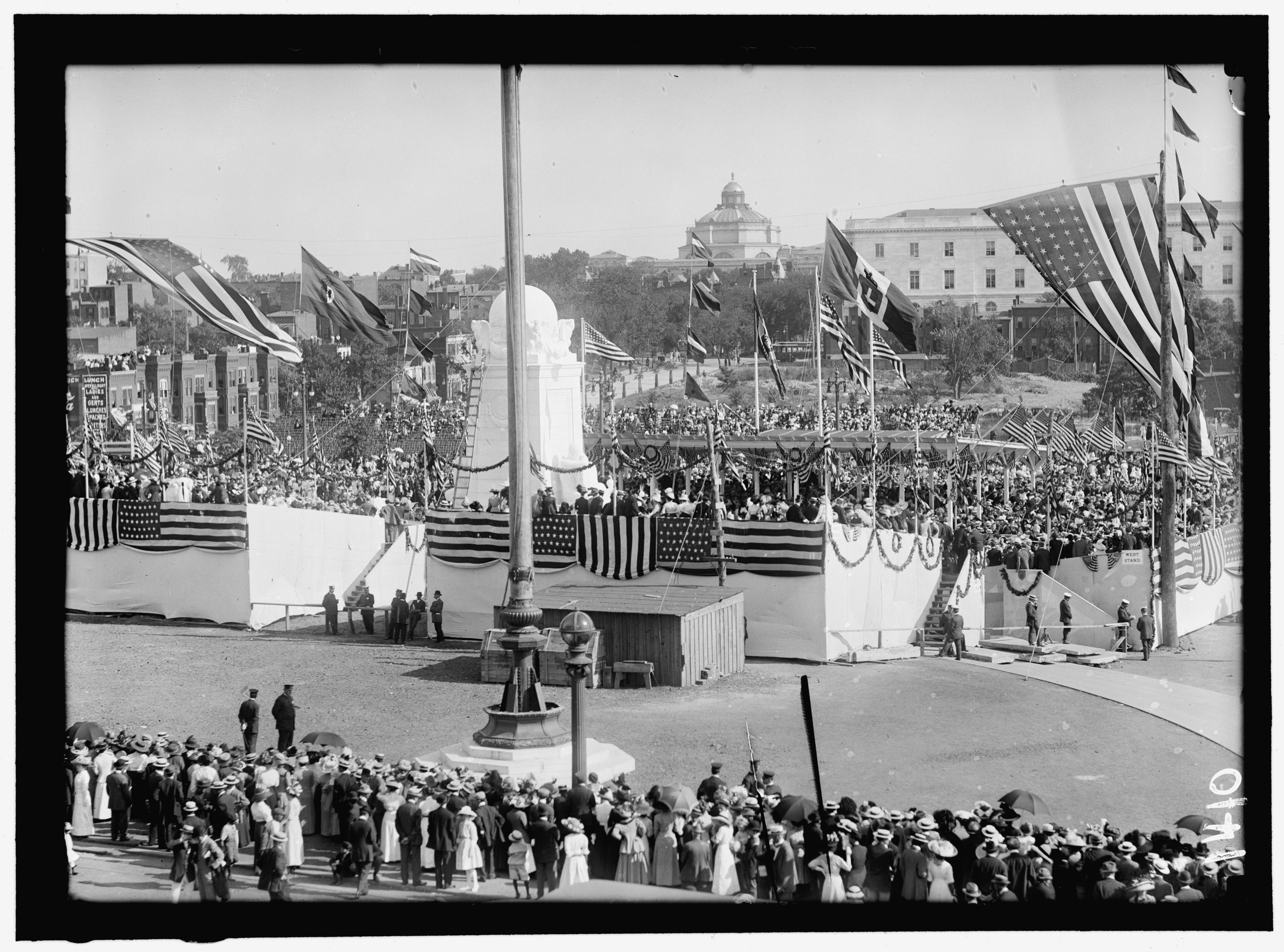
General view after the ceremony

At 8:00 pm, a public banquet was held at the Convention Hall at the intersection of K Street NW and 5th Street NE with 1830 Knights of Columbus present. Plates were sold for $10. In honor of the visiting Knights, the District Building was illuminated from 8:00 pm to 11:00 pm and an invitation issued to the public to visit the building from 9:00 am to 3:00 pm. Police forces were also on standby to accommodate this increase in population.

At the same time, a firing of salute was taking place near the White House followed by fireworks from 8:30 pm to 9:30 pm. A large crowd gathered on The Ellipse to watch as stars and as the Santa Maria were displayed.

=== Sunday, June 9 ===
On Sunday at 7:00 am, veterans assembled at the St. Patrick's Catholic Church for military mass with Cardinal James Gibbons. An estimated 10,000 people were believed to attend the mass. At 8:00 pm, a final public concert was held at the Convention Hall featuring the US Marine Band and Symphony Orchestra of sixty pieces.

== Columbus Day ==
Every year Columbus Day celebrations are held featuring the US Marine Corps Band and a wreath laying ceremony.

== Condition and conservation ==
It was added to the National Register of Historic Places, on March 7, 1968.

In October 1991 the memorial was spray painted with graffiti reading "500 Years of Genocide" during a wreath-laying ceremony by the Knights of Columbus ("500 Years of Faith") and the National Park Service removed it with surface cleaners. In March 1994 the work was surveyed by the Save Outdoor Sculpture! program and was described as needing treatment.

By the 2010s, the fountain had fallen into a state of disrepair. According to the Union Station Redevelopment Corporation (USRC), the fountain suffered from significant structural issues. The statues had been painted over to hide the discolorations and the fountain basins were boarded up to avoid further damage as the plumbing does not function. On May 25, 2016, the National Park Services and the USRC announced that Fountain had been selected as one of 20 historic places to compete for a share of $2 million in grants under the National Trust for Historic Preservation's Partners in Preservation program.

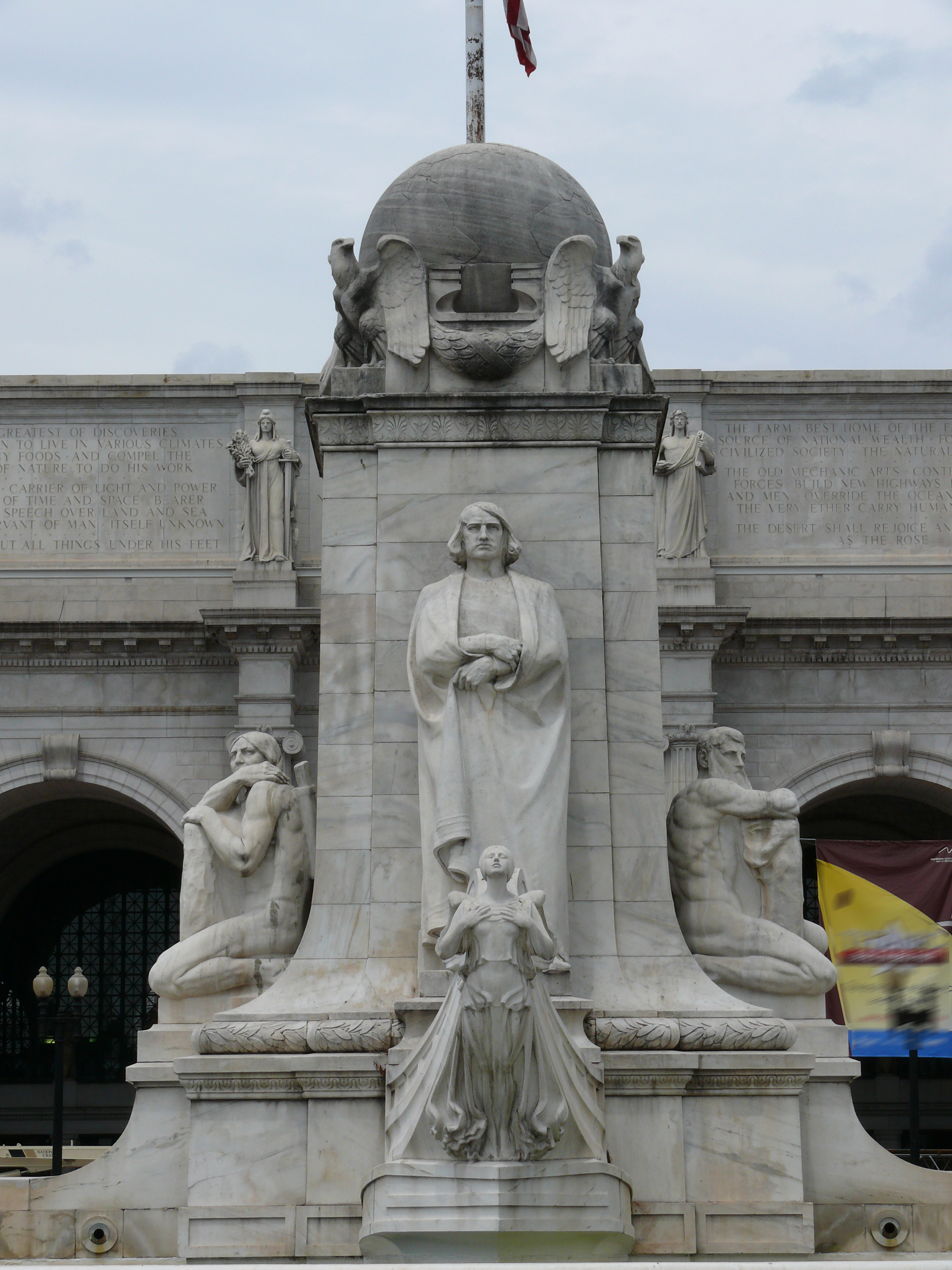
The front of the fountain

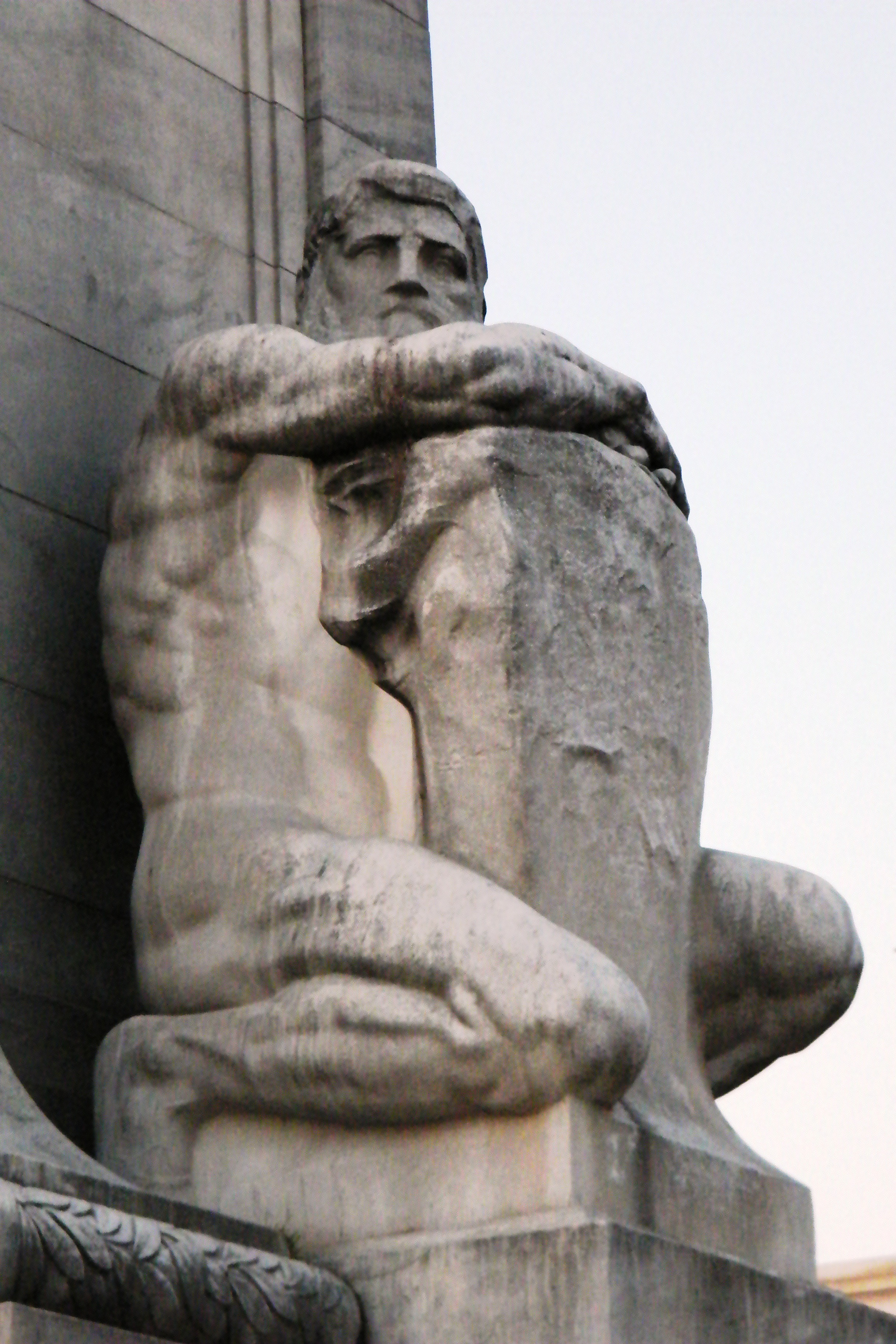
Detail of the "elderly" figure

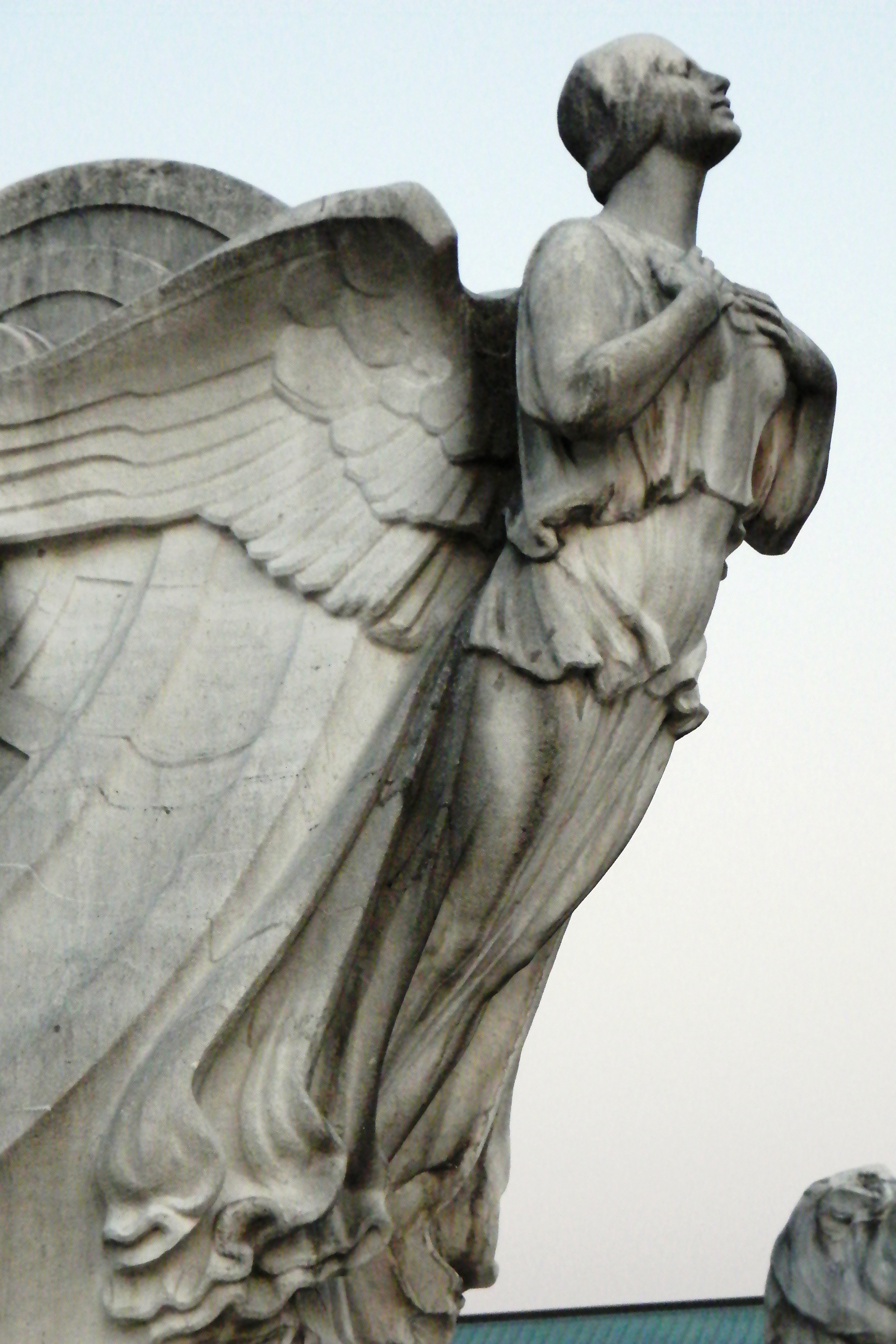
Detail of the figurehead

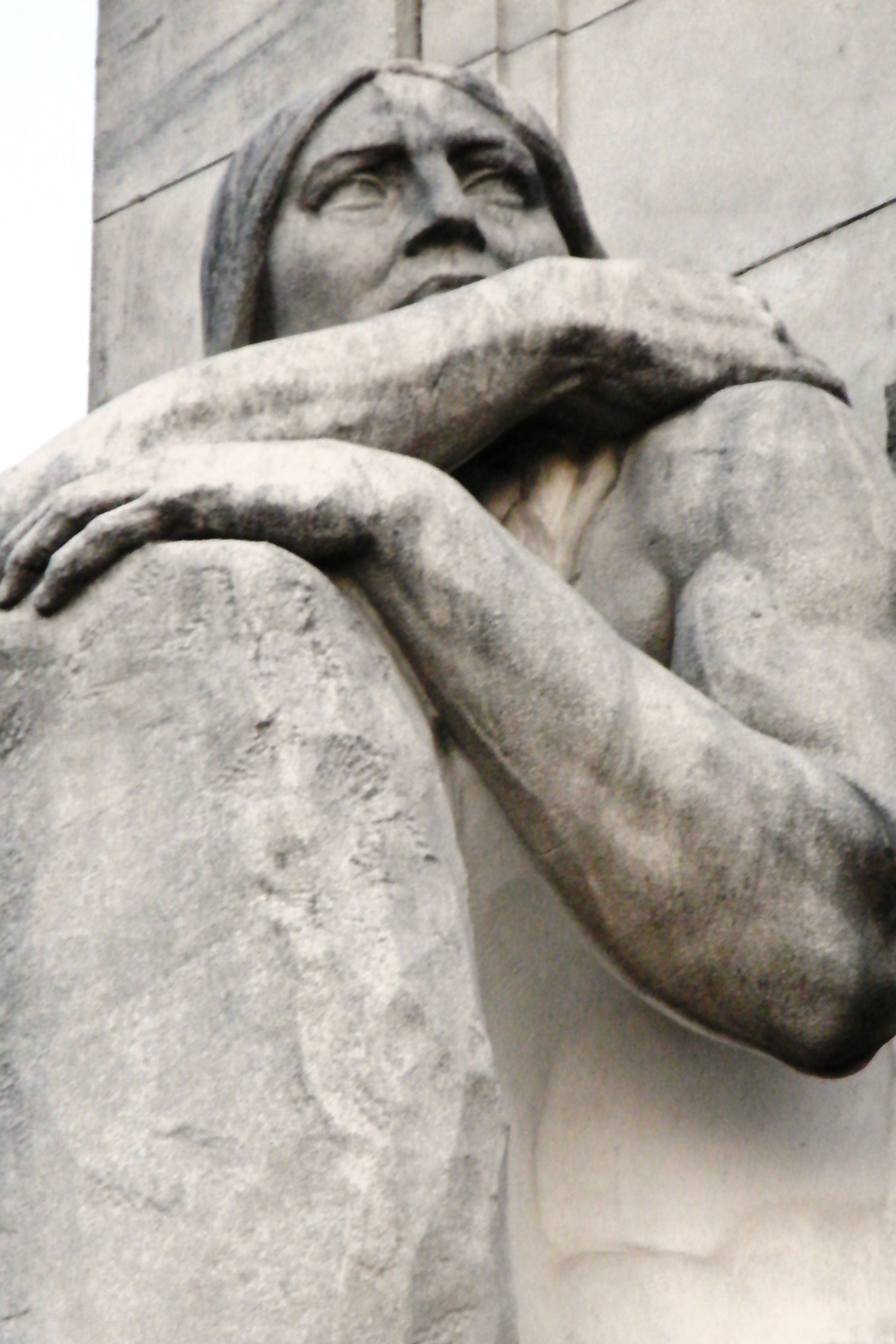
Detail of the American Indian figure

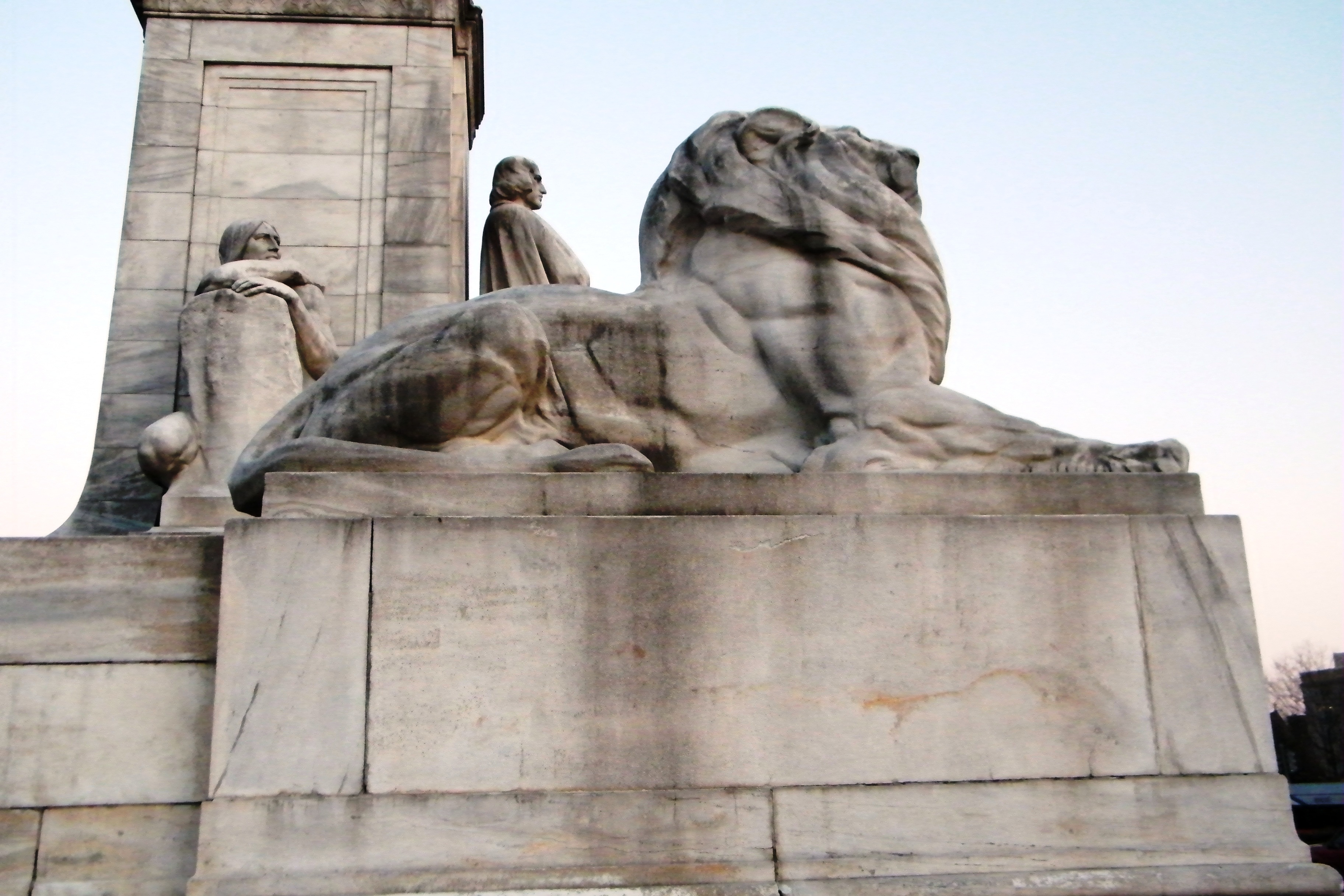
Detail of one of the two lions that flank the fountain

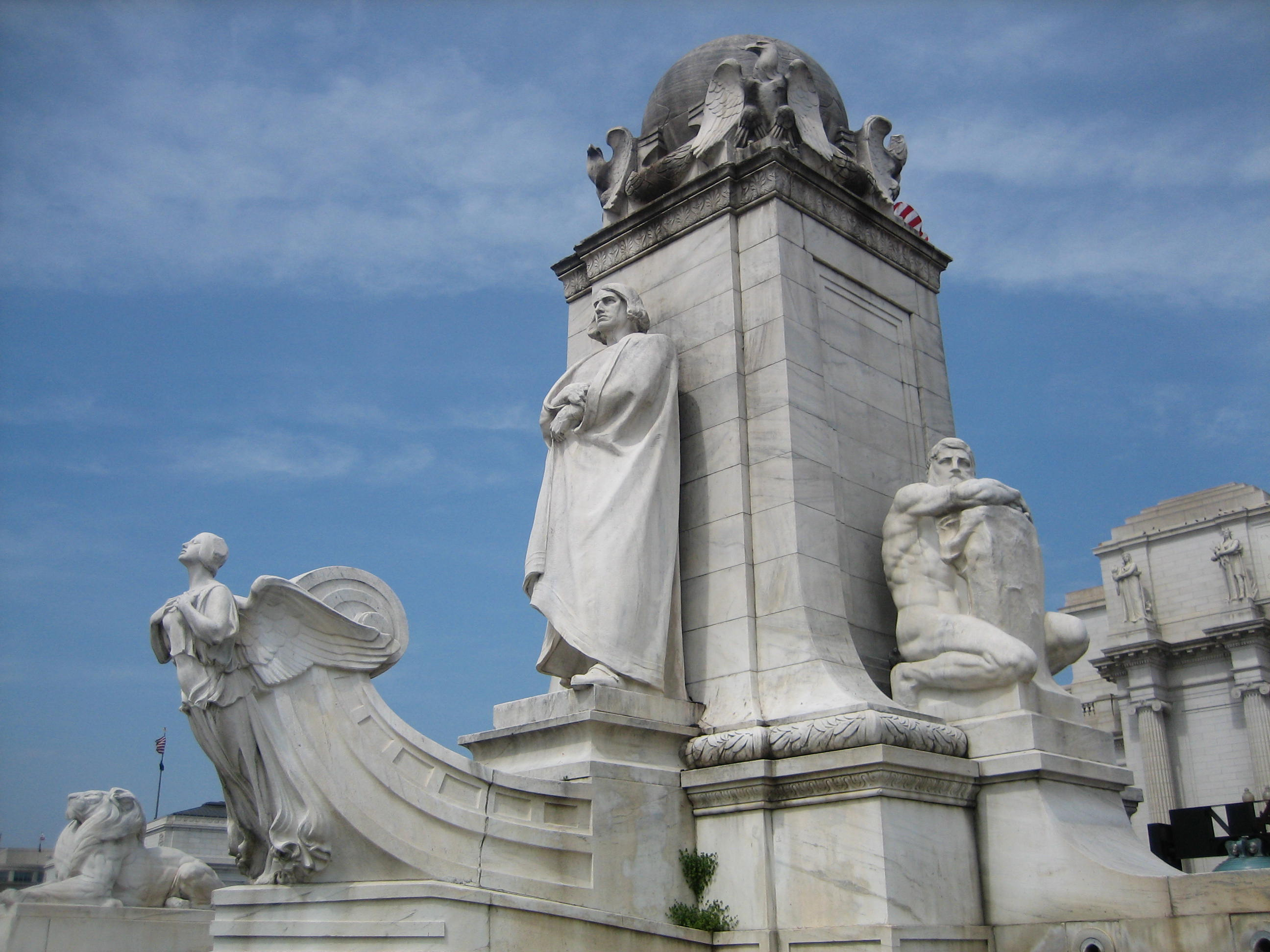
The fountain looking toward the north-west

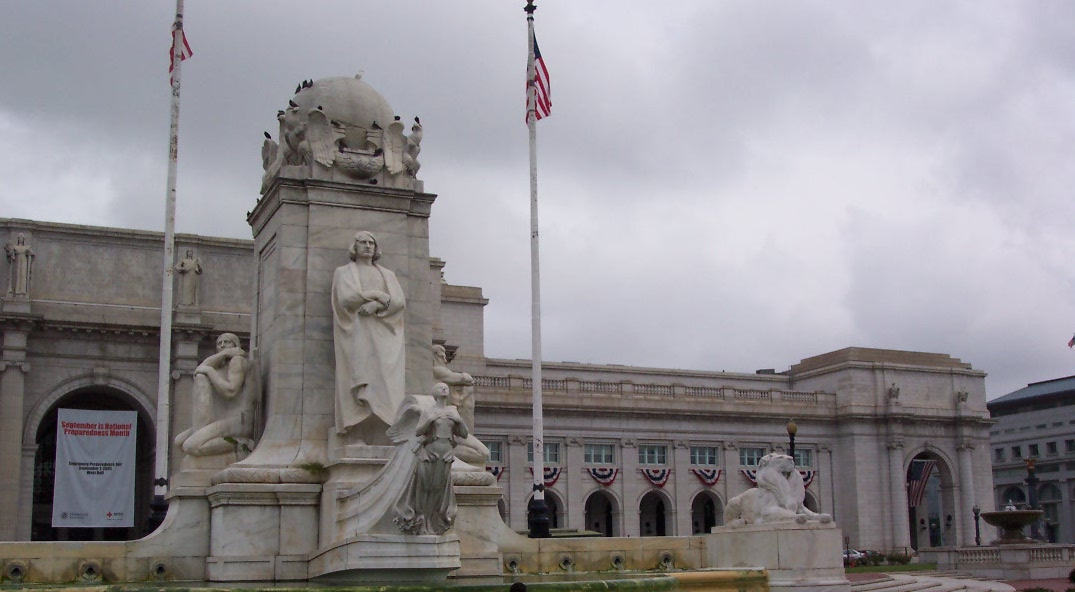
Algae and grass growing in 2005

In July 2024, the fountain was vandalized with graffiti by people protesting a speech given to the U.S. Congress by Israeli Prime Minister Benjamin Netanyahu, with messages written such as “Hamas is coming”, “Free Gaza”, “Long Live Resistance” and “All Zionists Are Bastards”. Zaid Mohammad Mahdawi, who wrote the graffiti supporting Hamas, was later arrested by the United States Park Police and the FBI.

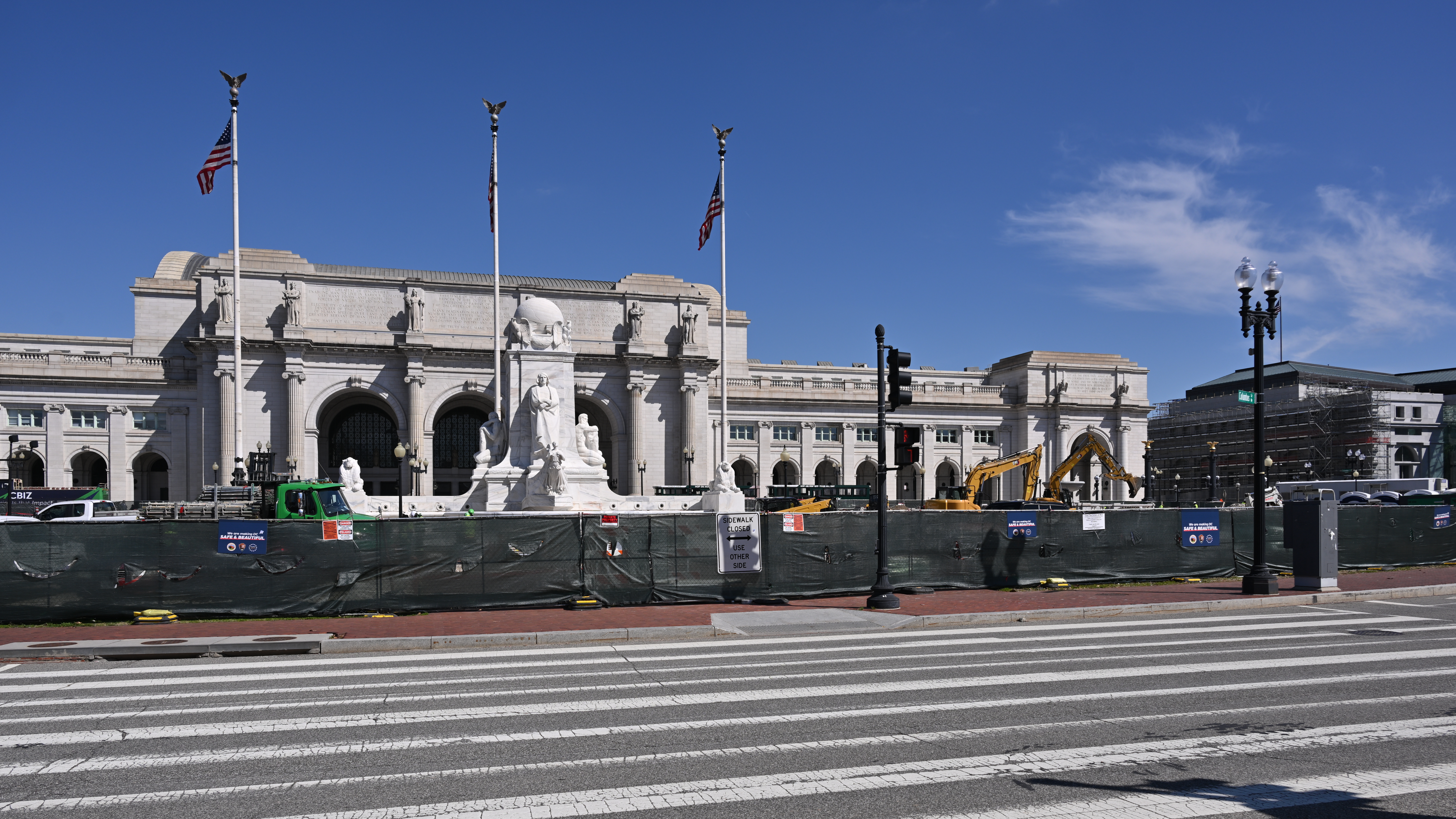
2026 Columbus Circle renovation

In December of 2025, Columbus Circle was closed "for the renovation of the fountain, cleaning of the statues, plaza and turf renovations to the park site".

In May 2026, the fountain was declared operational and reopened.

== See also ==
- List of monuments and memorials to Christopher Columbus
- List of public art in Washington, D.C., Ward 6
