= Columbus Circle (Washington, D.C.) =

Traffic circle in Washington, D.C.

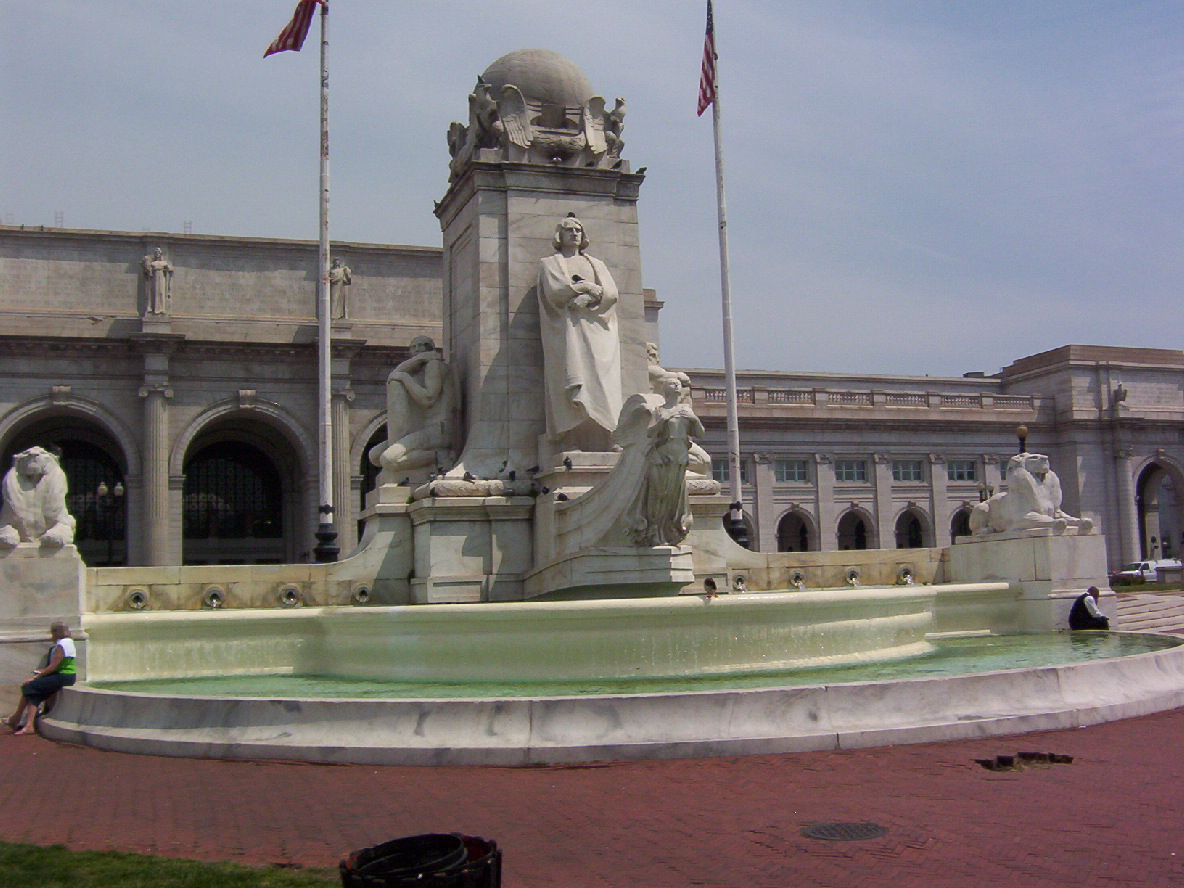
- In the center of Columbus Circle is the Columbus Fountain, a monument to Christopher Columbus.
- Interactive map of Columbus Circle

Location
- Washington, D.C.
- Coordinates: 38°53′47.04″N 77°0′23.76″W
- Roads at junction: Massachusetts Avenue NE; Louisiana Avenue NE; Delaware Avenue NE; 1st Street NE; E Street NE

Construction
- Type: Traffic circle
- Maintained by: DDOT
- Columbus Circle
- U.S. National Register of Historic Places
- Built: 1912
- NRHP reference No.: 80004523
- Added to NRHP: April 9, 1980

Columbus Circle, also known as Union Station Plaza or Columbus Plaza, is a traffic circle at the intersection of Delaware, Louisiana and Massachusetts Avenues and E and First Streets, Northeast in Washington, D.C., United States. It is located in front of Union Station right next to the grounds of the United States Capitol. Union Station and its access roads interrupt this circle on one side, forming an arc.

The Thurgood Marshall Federal Judiciary Building is located on the eastern side and the National Postal Museum is on the western side of the plaza next to Union Station. Both buildings are on the northern side of Massachusetts Avenue NE.

== History ==
In 1907, Union Station opened on the site of what was once a poor Irish neighborhood called Swampoodle. Most of the land around it had been leveled and all the houses razed. The area in front of the Station originally was called Union Station Plaza or the Plaza of Union Station.

The plaza was put through a massive renovation between 2011 and 2013.

Starting in December of 2025 and continuing until June 2026, Columbus Circle is closed "for the renovation of the fountain, cleaning of the statues, plaza and turf renovations to the park site".

The Circle the Congressional appropriation leading to the Columbus Fountain (1906)

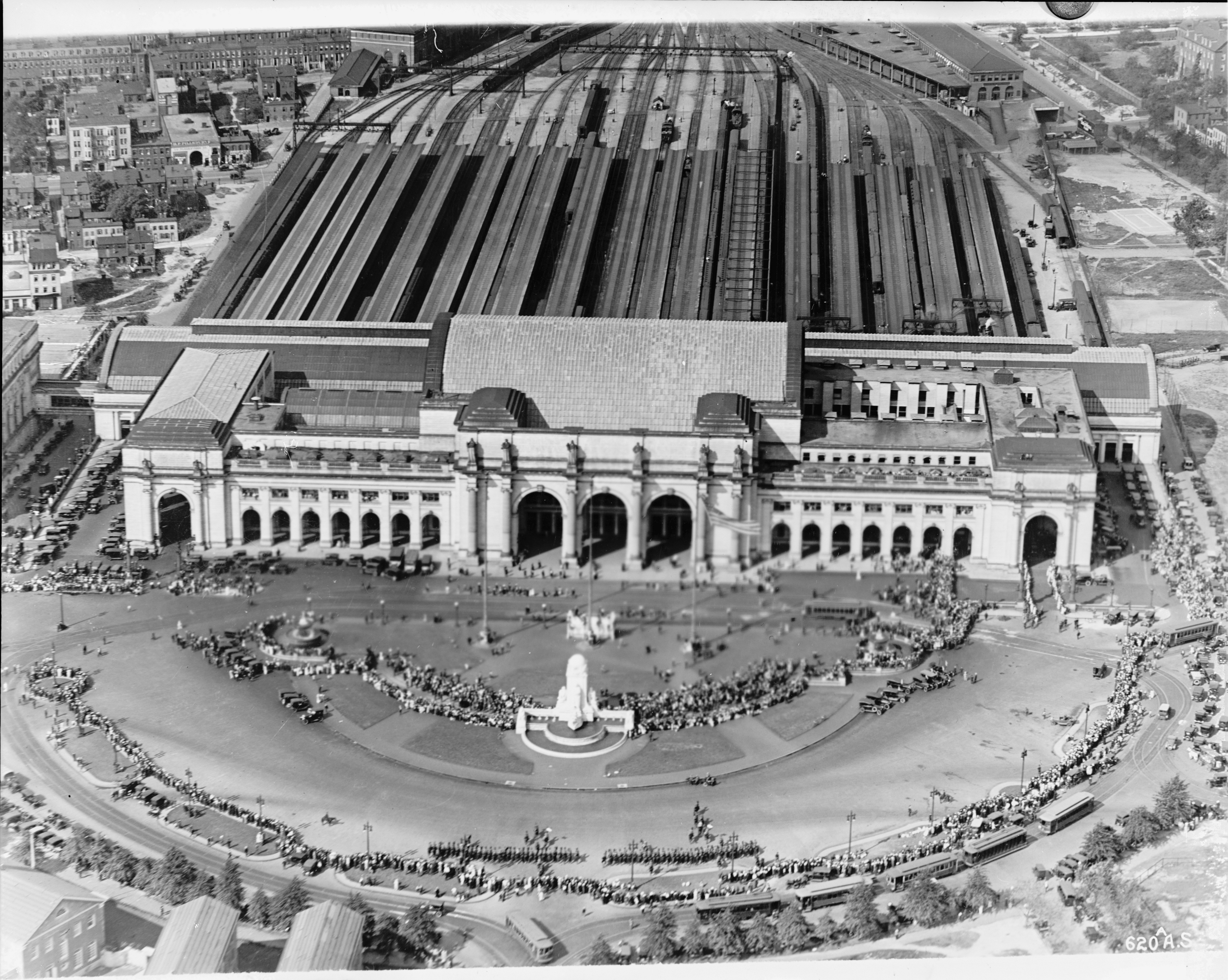
Columbus Circle with the fountain from the air in the 1920s

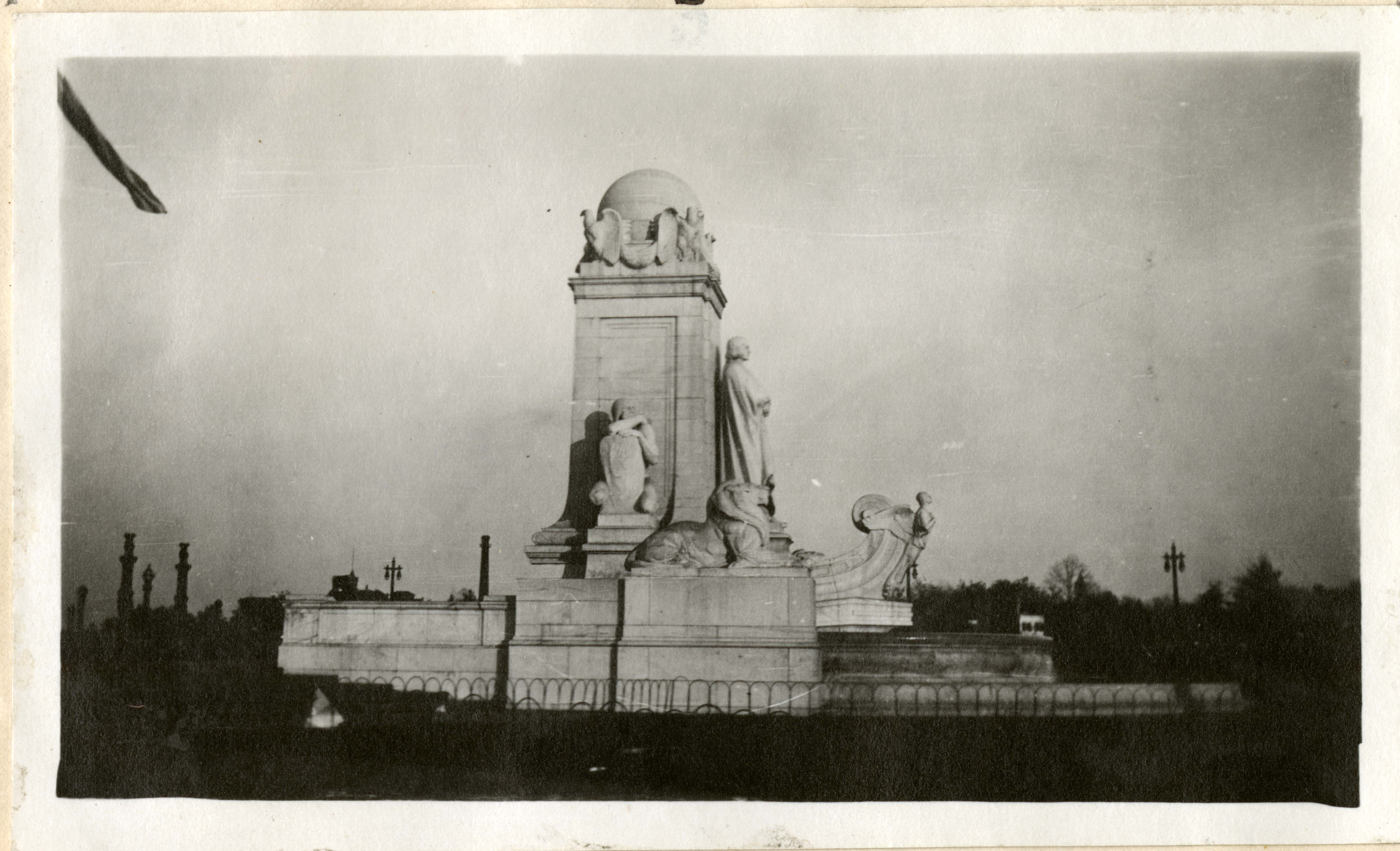
The Columbus Fountain in 1919

== Structures ==
The centerpiece of the circle is the Columbus Fountain, flanked by three 110 ft (34 m) flagpoles, designed by Daniel Burnham and sculpted by Lorado Taft. It was unveiled on June 8, 1912 in a three-day celebration involving tens of thousands of people (including the US Army, Navy and Marines) and several dignitaries including President William H. Taft and the Italian Ambassador to the United States. Parades, concerts and fireworks drow citizens of the city and many Knights of Columbus from around the country. It was not part of the original design of the Circle or of Union Station. This is when the plaza started to be called Columbus Circle due to the monument present in its center.

Two small fountains on each side of the Columbus Fountain frame the circle along with several stone balustrades. These fountains are accessible by the two staircases located on both sides of the central fountain.

The circle is ringed by flags of each of the 50 U.S. states in order of admission to the Union plus the flags of the U.S. territories and the District of Columbia. The flag poles are located on the southern side of the road.

== Access ==
Columbus Circle being located in front of Union Station is very accessible with various means of transportation.

Two streetcars lines used to circle on Columbus sharing tracks: the Capitol Traction Company and the Washington Railway & Electric Company. The Capitol Traction Company went down New Jersey Avenue NW, turning on Massachusetts Avenue NW and exiting on the opposite side of the Circle to F Street NE. Today the streetcar stops on the opposite side of the station.

Cars were always present but the traffic patterns changed over the years. In the early days, cars could park around the plaza. As cars started taking over, other alternatives had to be found and parking on or near the plaza was no longer possible. Union Station struggled with parking until the 1980s when a parking lot was built on the back of station. Today, cars can drive around the circle to continue on Massachusetts Avenue but parking or stopping is forbidden. Cars can drive between the station and the Columbus Fountain on two access roads but they can only drop off or pickup passengers from the station.

Today, Columbus Plaza is mainly pedestrian with large walkways and several crosswalks providing access. On the station side, the crosswalk do not have lights due to the low speed of vehicles but on Southside, traffic lights offer a safer access for pedestrians.

A Capital Bikeshare station is located on the side of Union Station off of F Street NE. Bike racks are available in front of Union Station and in 2009, DDOT announced the construction of the Bikestation on the west side of Union Station right off the plaza where the bike lane ends.
