= Women in the Vietnam War =

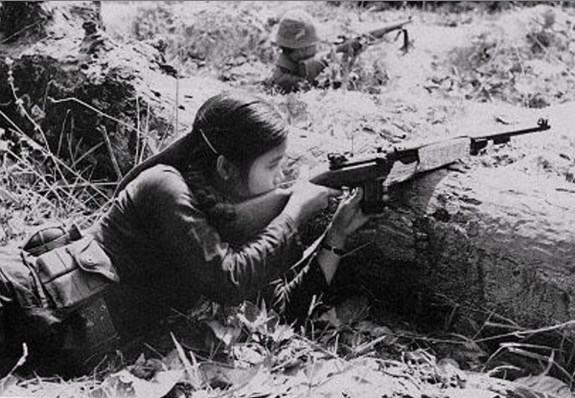
A Viet Cong guerilla

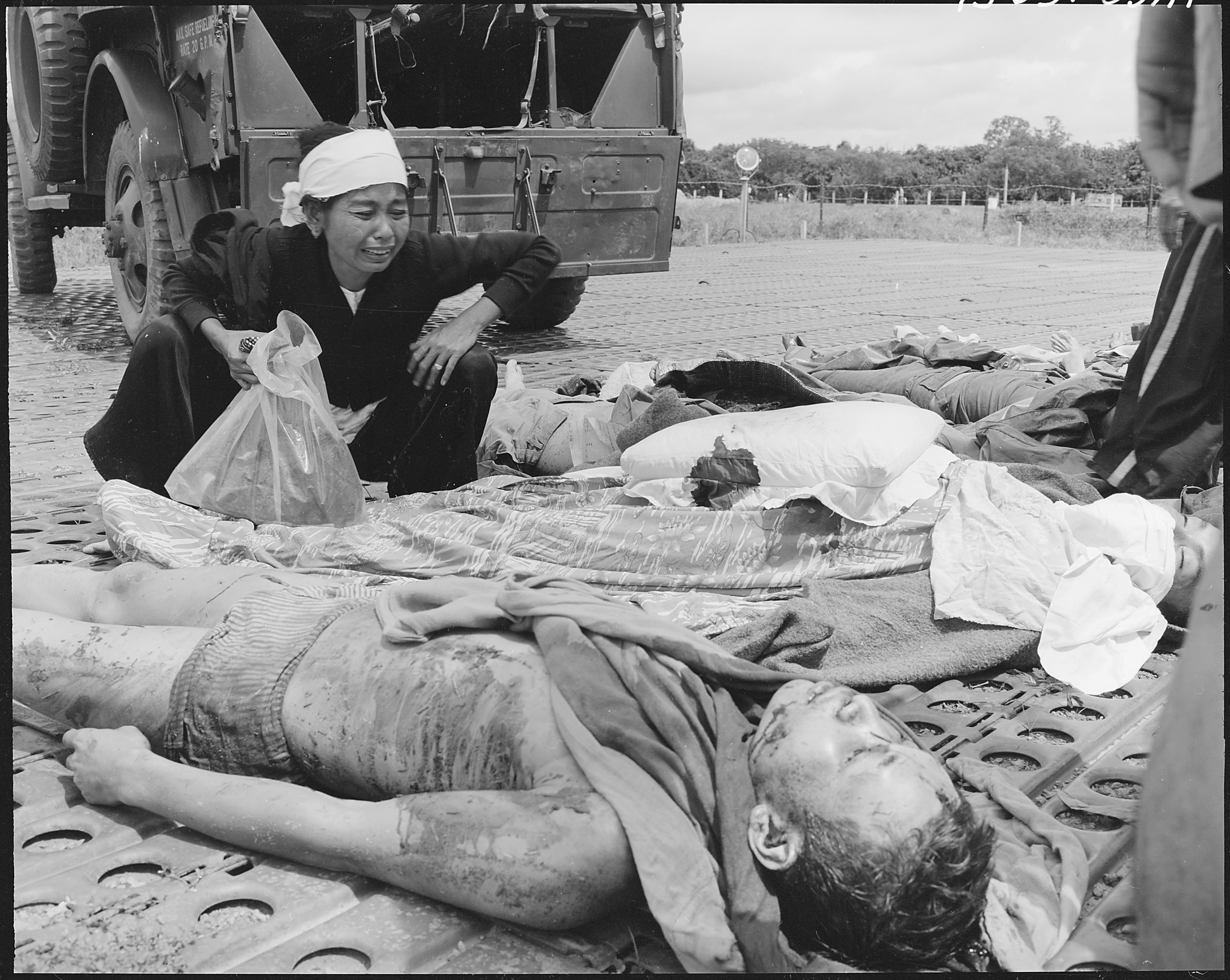
A Vietnamese woman weeps over the body of her husband, one of the South Vietnamese army casualties

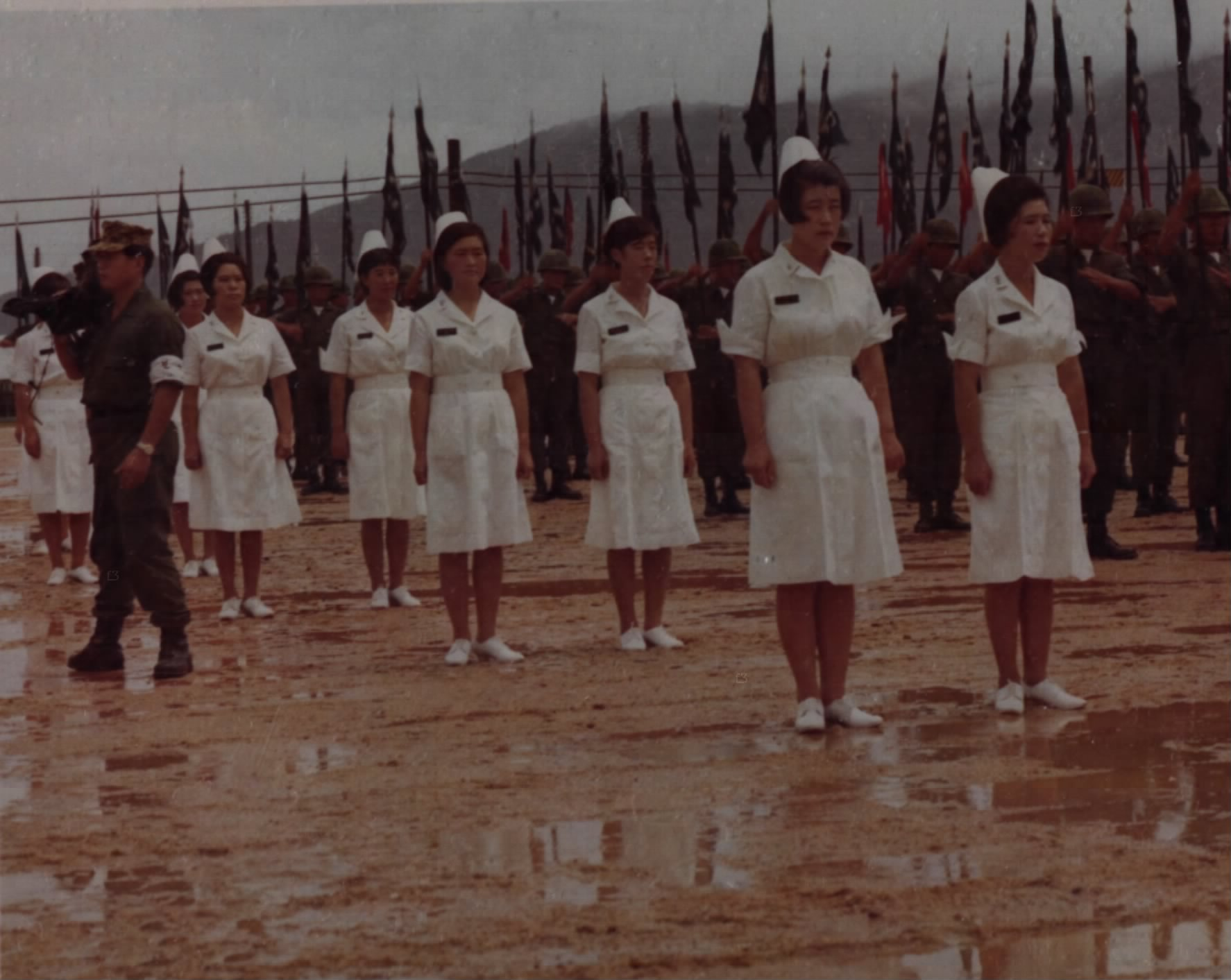
South Korean Tiger Division nurses, September 1968

Women in the Vietnam War were active in a large variety of roles, making significant impacts on the War and with the War having significant impacts on them.

Several million Vietnamese women served in the military and in militias during the War, particularly in the National Liberation Front of South Vietnam (also known as the Viet Cong), with the slogan "when war comes, even the women must fight" being widely used. These women made vital contributions on the Ho Chi Minh trail, in espionage efforts, medical care, logistical and administrative work, and, in some cases, direct combat against opposing forces.

Civilian women also had significant impacts during the Vietnam War, with women workers taking on more roles in the economy and Vietnam seeing an increase in legal women's rights. In Vietnam and around the world, women emerged as leaders of anti-war peace campaigns and made significant contributions to war journalism.

However, women still faced significant levels of discrimination during and after the War and were often targets of sexual violence and war crimes. Post-war, some Vietnamese women veterans faced difficulty reintegrating into civilian society and having their contributions recognised, as well as some advances in women's rights made during the War failing to be sustained. Portrayals of the War in fiction have also been criticised for their depictions of women, both for overlooking the role women played in the War and in reducing Vietnamese women to racist stereotypes. Women continue to be at the forefront of campaigns to deal with the aftermath of the War, such as the long-terms effect of Agent Orange use and the Lai Đại Hàn.

== Vietnamese women in the military ==
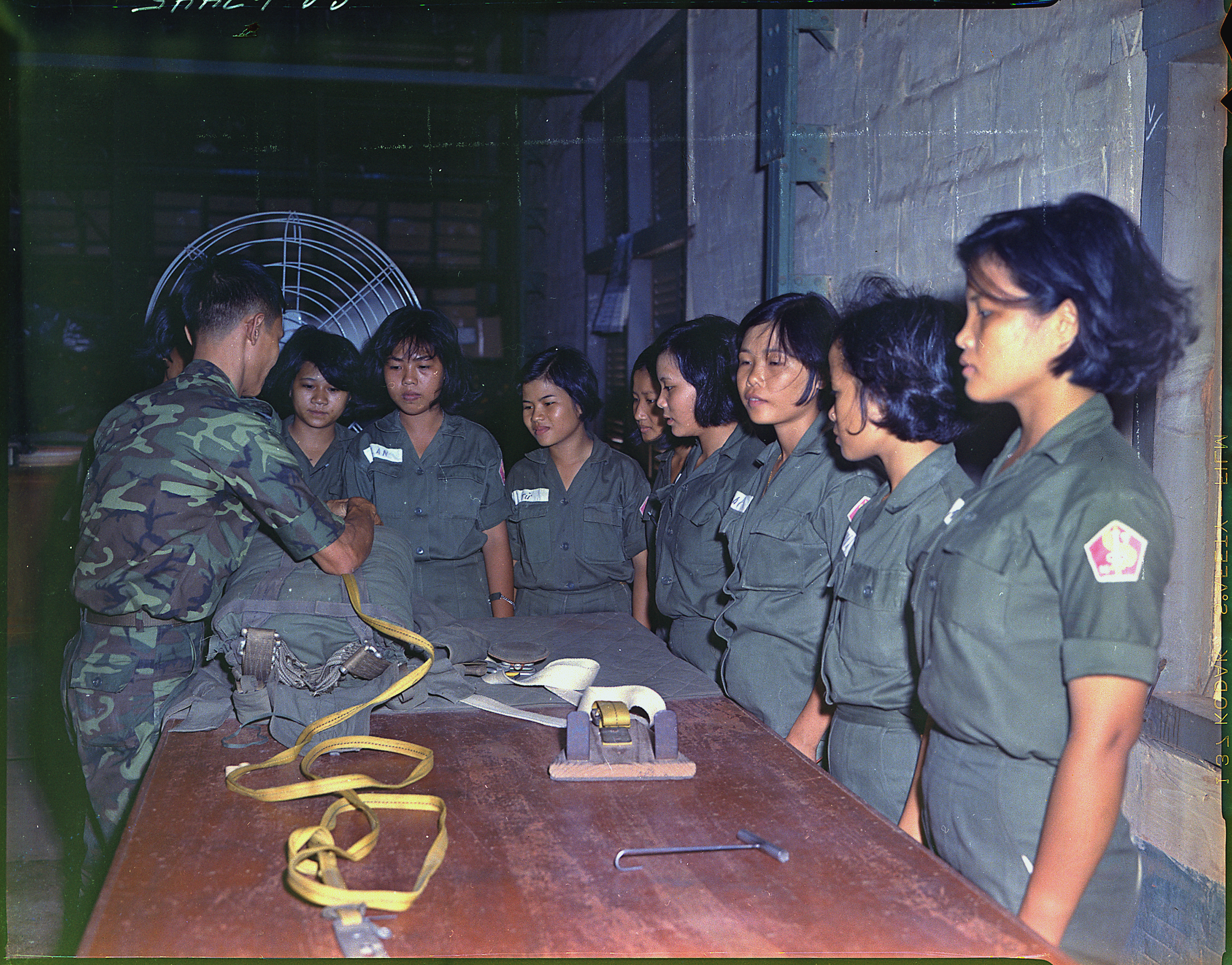
ARVN Women's Armed Forces Corps parachute training, July 1970

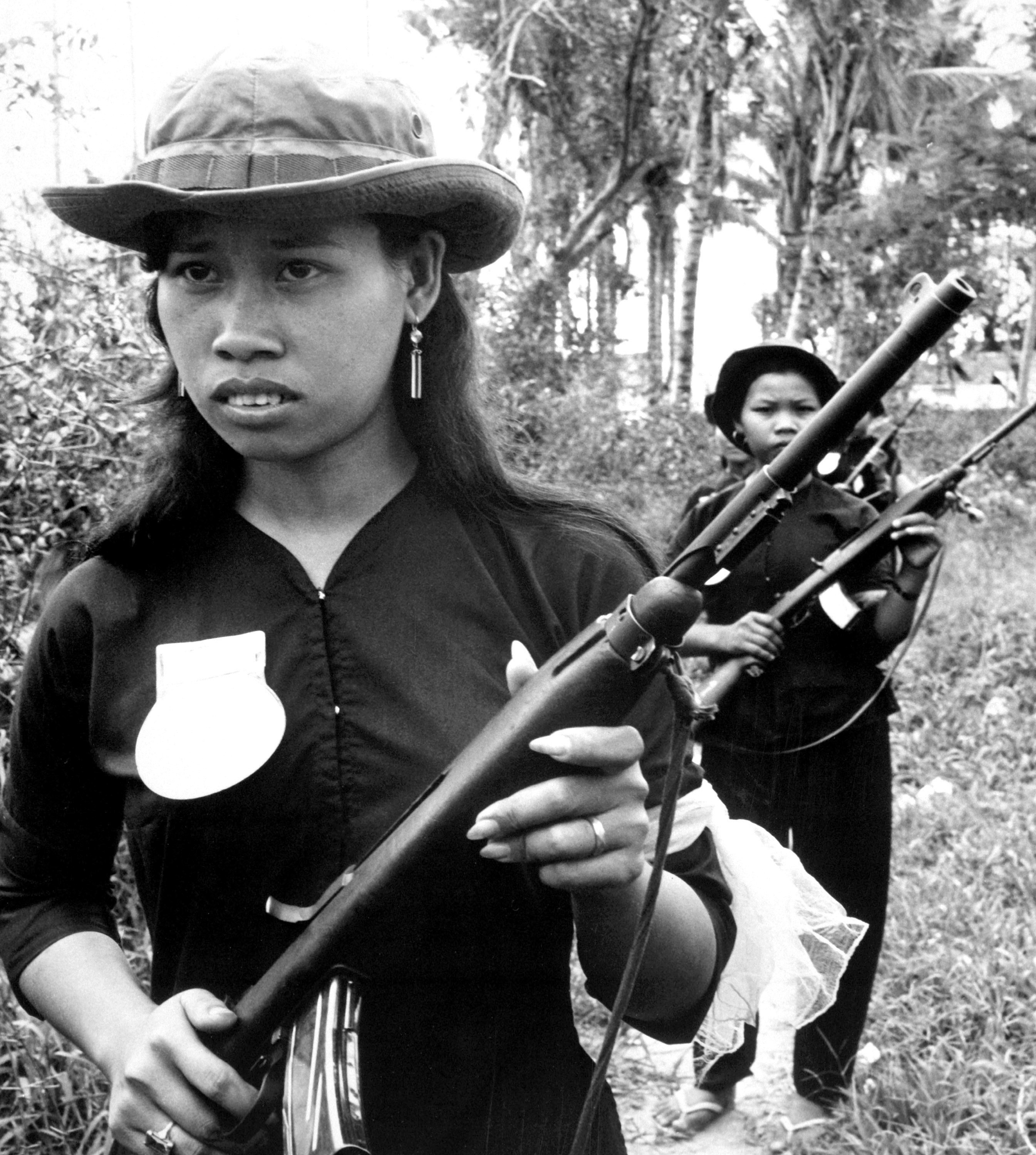
People's Self-Defense Force volunteers patrol to discourage Viet Cong infiltration

There is relatively little data about female Vietnam War veterans.

The Northern Vietnam government, led by Ho Chi Minh, made a number of feminist legal reforms to enhance social equity, such as new laws banning wife-beating, forced marriages and child marriages. In addition, they also focused on the roles of women outside of the traditional home for the purpose of industrial growth and development. As a result of this, North Vietnamese women were seen as essential participants, and were enlisted into the Viet Cong for the purposes of combat and manual labour, such as attacking and harassing American troops, being sent into the combat zone to lay booby-traps, and working as truck drivers and smugglers. Viet Cong women also played important roles in espionage against the Americans and the South Vietnamese as well as serving as liaisons to coordinate North Vietnamese squads and covertly pass information.

At least 1.5 million women served in the North Vietnamese military during the War and comprised as much as 70% of youth volunteers. There was often a high level of enthusiasm among young women in joining the Viet Cong and North Vietnamese military, attracted by factors such as communist ideals of equality, the influence of women warriors in the Viet Minh and in Vietnamese history (such as the Trưng sisters), a desire to participate in what was seen as a revolutionary struggle for independence, and a desire to avenge brutal attacks by South Vietnamese and American troops against their villages. However, despite those ideals of equality and that enthusiasm, discrimination against women was still rife throughout the war. Women in the military were often considered as only capable of fulfilling support duties, with gendered division of labour prominent in most camps, restrictions on direct combat with Americans troops (although not with ARVN troops), and with war propaganda often emphasising portraits of motherhood and beauty, such as through characterising military women as "flowers on the frontlines".

Most of the women serving in South Vietnam were trained as nurses and government office clerks. The Women's Armed Forces Corps was created as part of the Army of the Republic of Vietnam, counting over 2700 members by 1967, however the Corps dealt with administrative tasks only. In 1968, after the Tet Offensive, the South Vietnamese National Assembly saw debate on a bill that would've introduced a draft for all women aged 18 to 25, however the bill failed to pass. That year, the People's Self-Defense Force was created as a local part-time militia and by 1970, over one million women would serve in it, with at least 100 000 in combat roles and with some undertaking Airborne School training.

=== Ho Chi Minh Trail ===
North Vietnamese women played an important role in the creation and maintenance of the Ho Chi Minh trail, which the United States National Security Agency called "one of the great achievements of military engineering of the 20th century" for its effectiveness in supplying troops in the south despite being the target of one of the most intense air interdiction campaigns in history. Women volunteers not only repaired existing roads and created new roads to expand the trail's network, they also transported supplies across the Trail, such as weapons, heavy artillery, and food, served as guides for soldiers and as lookouts, as well as accomplishing tasks like bomb disposal, emergency medicine, and combat duty.

The Youth Shock Brigades, who mostly operated along the Ho Chi Minh trail, saw large influxes of tens of thousands of young women and teenage girl recruits, leading to the Brigades being majority female during the War. The women of the Brigades received praise for their bravery and strength in war, with General Đồng Sĩ Nguyên stating that ""Especially along the Trường Sơn Cordillera, the girls of the Youth Shock Brigades were not the weaker sex as many people would think. To the contrary, they were 'the stronger sex'." However, the women in the Brigades often faced extreme conditions with little help from their superiors, including a lack of cotton pads for menstruation and high levels of sexual assault, and faced difficulties being accepted back into civilian society after the war. François Guillemot noted that "Even when sections of the TNXP were made up of women, they were still under male leadership. The war was basically run without anyone taking into consideration the particular physical and cultural specificity of women at war; in fact it was largely neglected, underestimated, or downright forgotten. In other words, the benefits of the victory of 1975 went to men alone."

A shrine exists today on the site of the Đồng Lộc Junction, an important strategic junction at the beginning of the Ho Chi Minh trail, where 10 young women volunteers were killed by an American bomb on 24 July 1968. In 2021, Sherry Buchanan published a book titled On The Ho Chi Minh Trail: The Blood Road, The Women Who Defended It, The Legacy about the role women soldiers played on the Trail.

=== Espionage ===
Women made a significant contribution to North Vietnamese espionage efforts. A 1998 paper from the Intelligence and National Security journal noted that "the depiction of Vietnamese women as spies is rare in memoirs, fiction, or even film" but that "the communist women were indeed a key to victory".

Northern spies were able to gather information in a range of different ways, including through the markets (the so-called "market mouth"), by recruiting teenagers to eavesdrop on their families, and by infiltrating military bases. One spy, Nguyen Thi Le On, who had been arrested and eventually incorrectly deemed not a communist by the South Vietnamese police, pretended to have gone mad from the torture she endured, at which point Southern troops freely told her sensitive information out of pity for a harmless old woman. The NLF, however, tended to discourage sex in espionage, such as seducing potential sources, both out of concern for traditional gender norms and to uphold the example of Ho Chi Minh, who was described as the "celibate married only to the cause of revolution". Women who infiltrated American bases and who were otherwise able to gain access to American officers, such as by serving as waitresses in bars popular with soldiers, could often take advantage of the fact of being underestimated, as the Americans assumed dangerous jobs would be done by men.

Women who served as spies faced great danger, as being caught meant almost certain torture or execution, such as in Chí Hòa Prison, which held thousands of women, or the notorious Côn Đảo Prison tiger cages, where at least 600 Viet Cong women were held prisoner from 1968 to 1975, some as young as 15. Every prison in the South contained dedicated women's sections due to the number being arrested.

Some women spies become national symbols, such as Võ Thị Thắng, who, upon receiving a 20-year sentence from South Vietnamese officials for an assassination attempt, simply smiled and retorted that "your government will not last that long". The Perfume River Squad, formed in 1967 as a top-secret North Vietnamese covert unit and made up of 11 young women, most of whom were still teenagers, was personally recognised by Ho Chi Minh, who wrote a poem about their exploits. The squad performed vital espionage tasks in city of Huế in preparation for the Tet Offensive and, during the offensive itself, saw action in the Battle of Huế, originally being called on to transport casualties before engaging in combat around Tự Do Stadium and the city's markets. Several women spies were awarded the Hero of the People's Armed Forces, such as Đinh Thị Vân, who created an underground espionage network that passed through the major cities from the North to Saigon, and Le Thi Thu Nguyet, who bombed several American military facilities and earned the nickname "Iron Bird" for her toughness.

Sisters Thieu Thi Tam and Thieu Thi Tao were imprisoned in Côn Đảo after leading a failed plot to bomb the Saigon central police station. During their imprisonment, they compiled a list of political prisoners held in Côn Đảo and were able to smuggle it out to be used as evidence during the negotiations for the Paris Peace Accords.

=== Combatants ===
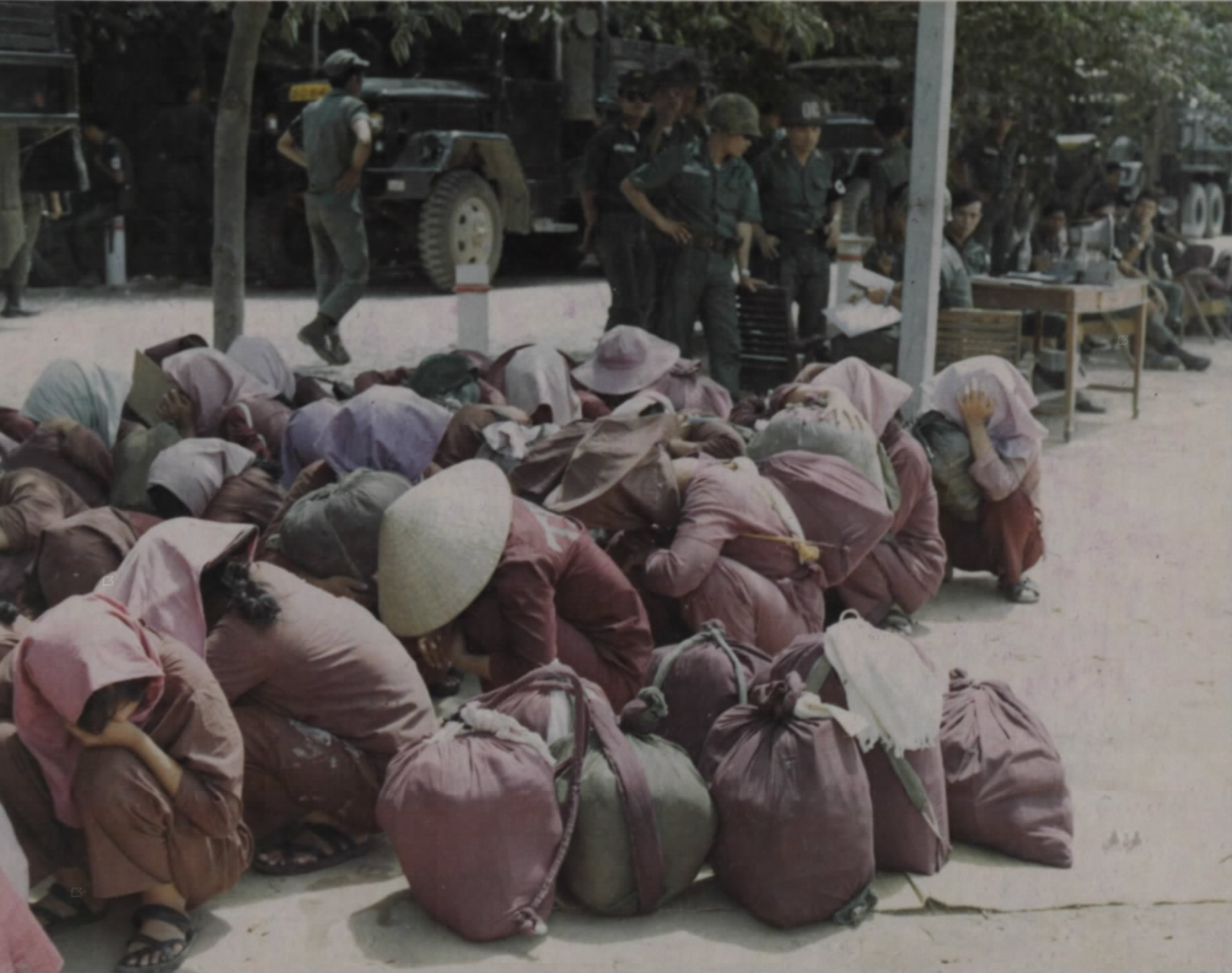
Women Viet Cong taken prisoner, January 1973

Both South and North Vietnamese women served as active combatants during the war, particularly in the National Liberation Front due to promises of female equality and a greater social role within society. Ho Chi Minh urged Vietnamese women to prioritize three duties during the Vietnam War: "continue production when men went into the army so that the people would be fed, to run family affairs and care for their children, and to fight the enemy when necessary." All-female units were present throughout the entirety of the war, ranging from front-line combat troops to anti-aircraft, scout and reconnaissance units. A 2012 paper in Signs noted the use of the slogan "when war comes, even the women must fight" and that "North Vietnamese women volunteered to go to the front during the war, took charge, and carried out tasks equal to those of men."

Women played a prominent role in the Đồng Khởi Movement in the late 1950s and early 1960s, with Nguyễn Thị Định serving as a co-founder and deputy commander of the National Liberation Front. In 1961, over 3000 women were counted as serving as guerillas in Bến Tre Province alone. A 2018 Open Library of Humanities paper described an early battle in the province in December 1959:

Women in the Mekong Delta's Bên Tre Province took the initiative. They spread rumors through the Market Mouth — women hunkering behind their wares, buying and selling, bartering and chatting, and sending and receiving undercover messages — that armed men returning from the North were preparing to strike. The rumors were pure invention. The women, who had no weapons, carved bamboo stems to look like guns. They tied up their hair so they would resemble men. At twilight on January 2, 1960, the women encircled a U.S.-backed ARVN base. They set off firecrackers, which exploded like gunfire as the women darted this way and that, imitating soldiers attacking, their palm-stem guns silhouetted in the smoke-filled dusk. Already frightened by the false rumors that had spread through the markets, the ARVN soldiers fled, tossing aside their weapons. The women gathered up the ARVN troops' abandoned guns and ammunition. Using lightning strikes, Mme. Định and her female troops liberated the rest of their district, which they held throughout the war.

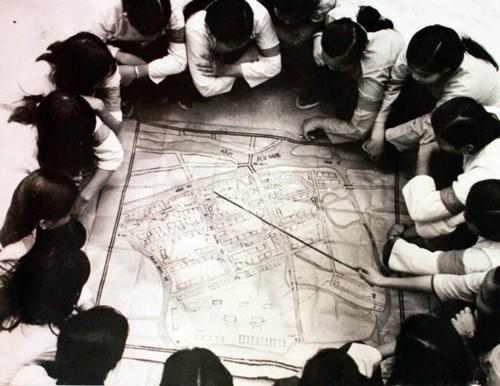
A Viet Cong squad studying a map of Saigon during the Tet Offensive

A number of female fighters gained reputations for their accomplishments on the battlefield.Vo Thi Mo, who served as second-in-command of the Viet Cong C3 battalion and was allegedly the best fighter in the battalion, was featured on official government seals for her exploits, including her defence of the Củ Chi tunnels. Another sniper and deputy leader of a guerilla platoon, Lê Thị Hồng Gấm, was posthumously named a Hero of the People's Armed Forces after a battle in which she fought against three American helicopters, downing one and holding off the others long enough to allow her platoon time to retreat before she ran out of bullets and was killed.

In the South Vietnamese Rangers, master sergeant and medic Ho Thi Que achieved notoriety for her prowess in combat, with the Chicago Tribune noting that "she fought beside the men with a pair of .45 automatics strapped to her hips and wearing a polished steel helmet emblazoned with a tiger's head," which earned her the moniker of Tiger Lady of the Mekong Delta.

=== Recruitment and propaganda ===
Women played a vital role in recruitment and propaganda efforts for North Vietnam. Radio personality Trịnh Thị Ngọ, also known as Hanoi Hannah, gained prominence for her English-language broadcasts directed at United States troops. Women staged peaceful confrontations right in front of ARVN troops with the goal of convincing those who had been conscripted to desert and to shame the others into giving up the fight.

The women working on the Trail were also used for morale efforts. The military decided that they would recruit women who had been youth volunteers before to drive truck loads of soldiers up and down the Ho Chi Minh trail while American pilots were dropping bombs from the sky. The purpose of this was to show the male soldiers that if women can do it, they can stick it out.

Marc Jason Gilbert of Hawaii Pacific University, has argued that:

Most non-communists leaders like Bùi Diễm, the Republic of Vietnam's Ambassador to the United States, had known from their youth of the Trưng sisters' fame "as a part of the heroic flow of Vietnamese history" and also grasped the significance of their story as a rallying cry for freedom. Yet, the Republic of Vietnam failed to do much more than subsidize beautiful female Bob Hope-USO style recruitment entertainers and create a small token female force, the little-known Tiger Battalion, which never saw combat. This failure contributed in no small measure to the Republic of Vietnam's defeat, both in the field as well as on the propaganda front: armed veteran female Việt Cộng excelled in recruitment, in part by shaming men into joining a fight in which women were already engaged.

== Vietnamese women civilians ==
A number of civilian Vietnamese women served as volunteers for the Red Cross, Catholic Relief Services or other humanitarian organisations. Civilian women in South Vietnam were also able to gain employment as a hooch maid, cleaning and housekeeping for American soldiers. While Vietnamese women were active in combat, particularly women in the Viet Cong, the women most impacted were the civilian casualties.

=== North Vietnamese civilians ===
In response to the War, the North Vietnamese government promoted the Three Responsibilities movement. This movement called for women to step in agricultural production, to take over the running of their households when husbands went off to fight, and to join local militias to aid the defence of their villages.

The War also saw a number of changes to legislation of women's rights. In 1967, the Communist Party's Central Committee in North Vietnam passed Resolution 153. This resolution instated formal job quotas, requiring women to hold a minimum of 35% of all jobs and 50–70% of job in the educational sector. Most of these quotas were filled by the 1970s. The percentage of women sitting on people's councils In North Vietnam saw a large increase during the War, from around 20% in 1965 to 40% in 1972. However, the large majority of leadership positions on those councils were still held by men, and the percentage of women councillors dropped significantly after the end of the war. The end of the War also saw an increase in occupational segregation, as many women were pushed back into household roles by men leaving the military and with the influence of organisations such as the Vietnam Women's Union decreasing as the government no longer considered them crucial organizations.

=== American interaction with civilians ===
Although the main interaction American forces had with Vietnamese women civilians was with prostitutes or enemy combatants, that is not the only type of women they came across. U.S. troops also interacted with businesswomen secretaries or maids who worked for or made money from the U.S. military. The United States had a program to target these people to be trained to help America seize land from the Viet Cong and the U.S. also had the aim to gain their support whilst doing this. Women such as Nguyen Thi Nam, a twenty-seven-year-old mother of four, gave up their comfortable jobs as secretaries to become medics, in Nam's case with the Revolutionary Development team in Long An, a province south of Saigon that had been heavily infiltrated with Viet Cong, and progressed with the U.S. CORDS program – Civil Operations and Revolutionary Development Support. Civilian women all over South Vietnam got involved with the American forces in cases such as these and made themselves part of the war effort. The American motivation for such efforts was to gain favor amongst the people of Vietnam, especially the women, who they still worried could be spies and secret combatants.

== War crimes and violence against women ==
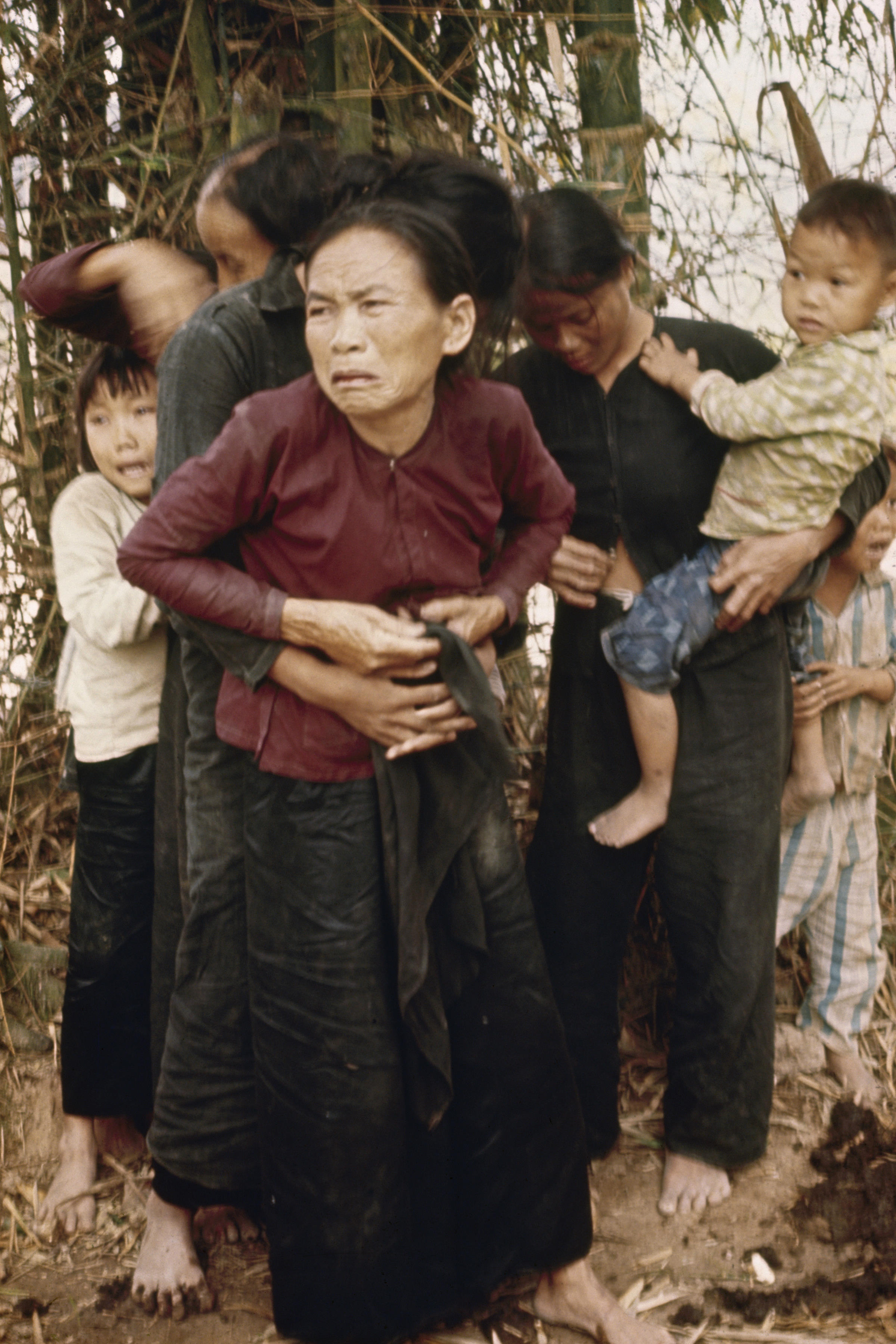
Unidentified Vietnamese women and children before being killed in the My Lai Massacre, 1968

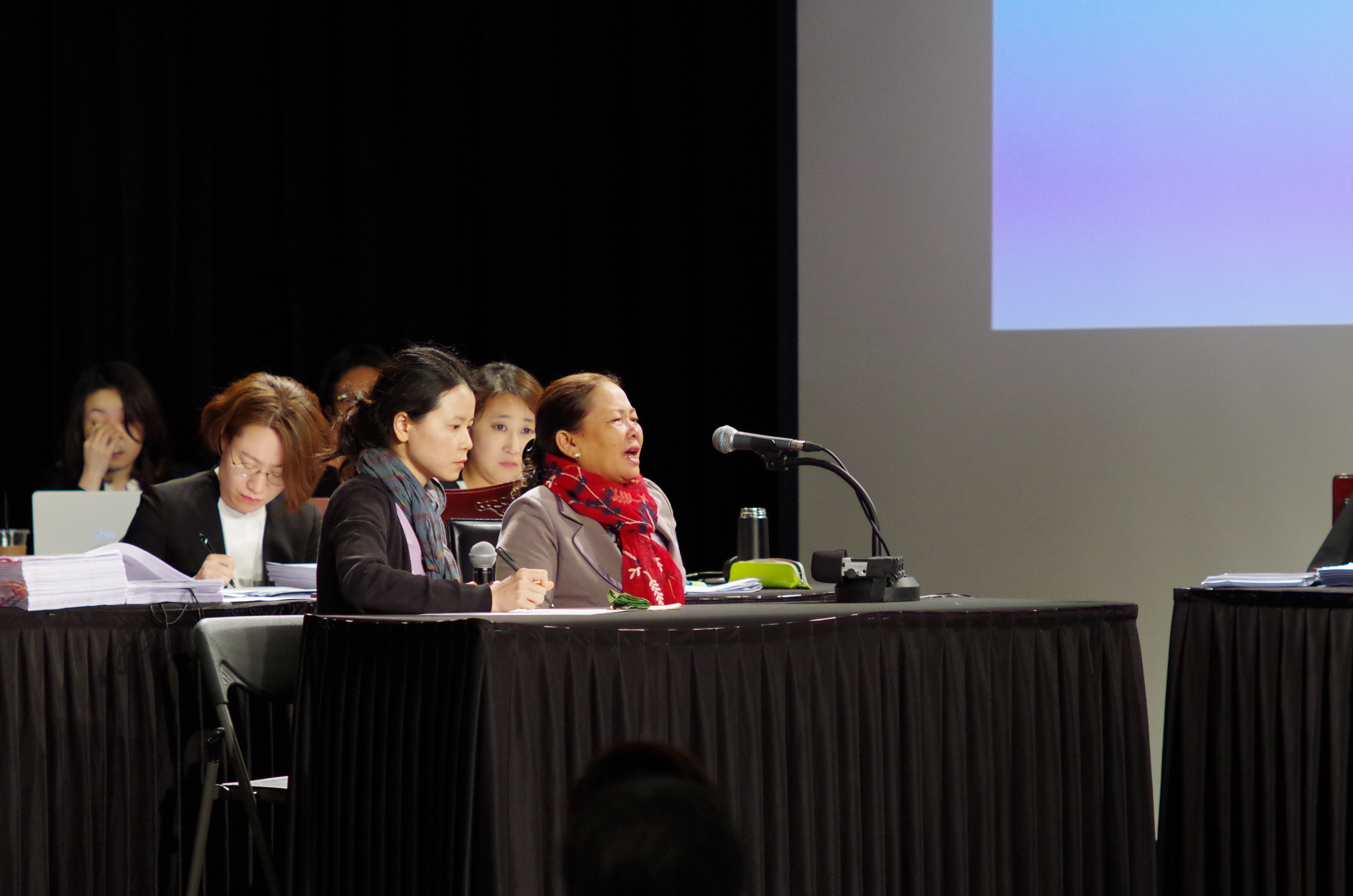
People's Tribunal on War Crimes by South Korean Troops during the Vietnam War, 2018

A large number of war crimes were committed during the Vietnam War and violence against women, especially sexual violence, was widespread. According to Karen Stuhldreher of the University of Washington, rapes during the war were rarely reported, and perpetrators were rarely convicted. She further states that raping female Viet Cong guerilla fighters in combat zones was often seen as an obligation to prove masculinity. Women who were raped were routinely murdered afterwards including in the Incident on Hill 192.

During the My Lai Massacre on 16 March 1968 in the South Vietnamese hamlet of Sơn Mỹ, Sơn Tịnh District, between 347 and 504 unarmed men, women and children were killed by American Soldiers. Some of the women were gang-raped and their bodies mutilated, as were children as young as 12, before being killed.

In addition, Vietnamese civilian women were subject to further sexual assaults during the breadth of the conflict, and much like the Korean War, they were used as "comfort women" and prostitutes. In 1990, the Korean Council for the Women Drafted for Military Sexual Slavery was established by nearly 40 progressive women's rights organisations in order to address the issue of comfort women and sex slaves kept for the Imperial Japanese Army. Over time, the council pledged that its long-term goal is to review all historical instances of sexual slavery within militaries to prevent any further sexual abuse of women during wartime. In March 2012, on International Women's Day, the council established the Butterfly Fund – a not for profit organisation that helps women who have been used and abused by military forces in times of war. Since its establishment, the fund had been providing support to victims of sexual violence in the Congo Civil War and the children born as a result of that violence. In 2013, the fund began its campaign to support the women assaulted in the Vietnam War. The Butterfly Fund's symbol – a butterfly – represents the hope of sexual assault survivors and the hope of other women that women will be freed from oppression, discrimination and violence and that one day all women and girls will be free to spread their wings.

The portrayal of rape and violence against women in popular media about the Vietnam War has faced criticism, both for centering American men instead of the Vietnamese women who were raped and for minimising the horror of the violence. Karen Stuhldreher argues that in popular portrayals of the War "the line between sex and violence becomes blurred" and that "the motivation provided by the narratives noticeably highlights the sexual".

=== Commercial sexual exploitation in South Vietnam ===
During the war over one million rural people migrated or fled the fighting in the South Vietnamese countryside to the cities, especially Saigon. Among the internal refugees were many young women who became the ubiquitous "bar girls" of wartime South Vietnam, "hawking her wares—be that cigarettes, liquor, or herself" to American and allied soldiers. American bases were ringed by bars and brothels.

The growth in prostitution not just in Vietnam, but in surrounding countries where American troops were based, with women working as prostitutes openly granted access onto military bases to work, American military doctors checking women for venereal disease, and with little efforts made to ensure that women working as prostitutes were legally adults. The American military at all levels was also weary of these women and the dangers they posed to American soldiers. Prostitutes were rumored to be dirty and possibly enemy combatants. Myths about Vietnamese prostitutes having teeth in their vaginas (so-called "vagina dentata" myths") circulated around army camps, as well as that of them carrying incurable venereal illnesses. Some believed these to have originated from the higher ranks in the army in an attempt to stop men sleeping with these prostitutes; others said they were circulated by soldiers as made-up legends. Either way, this shows the fears that American men had concerning Vietnamese women and their inability to tell friends from foe as well as their underlying anxiety concerning American power in Vietnam. American senator J. William Fulbright once complained that South Vietnam had become "America's brothel."

After the war and the reunification of Vietnam, the Vietnamese government cracked down heavily on prostitution, including criminalising it entirely and sending prostitutes to rehabilitation centres.

=== Lai Đại Hàn ===
Lai Đại Hàn is a Vietnamese term for a racially mixed person born to a South Korean father and a Vietnamese mother during the war. There are an estimated 5,000 to 30,000 of them. Many people falling under this category were conceived because of rape of Vietnamese women by South Korean soldiers. There were estimated to be 800 mothers of Lai Đại Hàn conceived due to rape who were still alive in 2015. Civic groups in Vietnam have campaigned for recognition of the issue and an apology by the Korean government.

== American women in the military ==
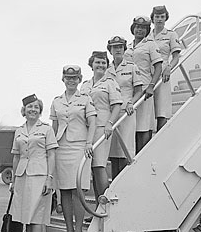
Five enlisted women and a female officer in the Air Force (WAF) arrive at Tan Son Nhut Air Base, South Vietnam. June, 1967

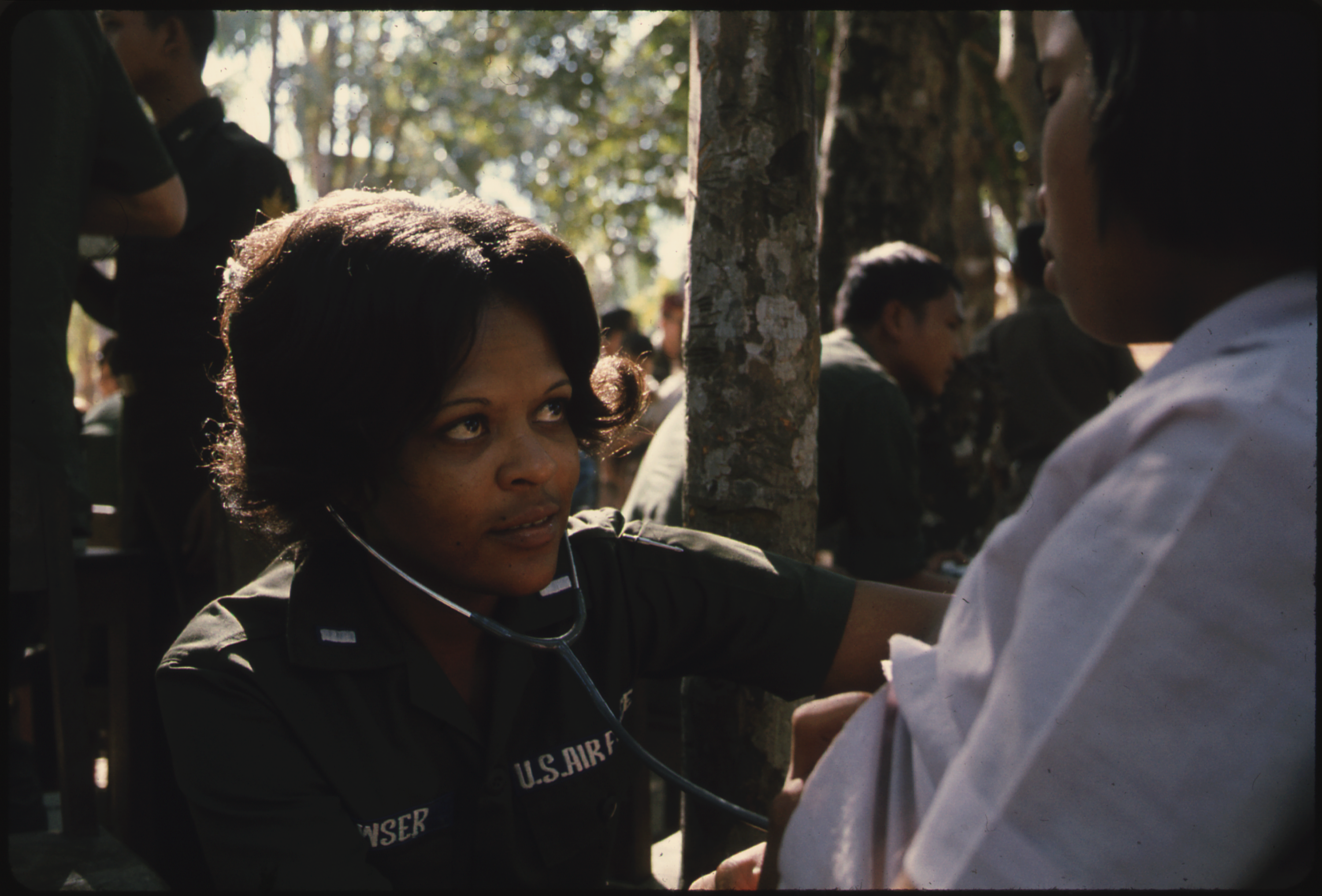
First Lieutenant Linda J. Bowser in Bong Son Village, Thailand, January 1974

In the United States during the time of the Vietnam War women were prohibited from serving in regular combat roles. Women did serve in a variety of support roles. "approximately 1,200" women served in the military in non-nursing roles. Starting in 1967 women became eligible to become generals and "flag ranks" along with eliminating "the 2 percent ceiling" in each of the branches of the military in active duty. In 1972 women were allowed to command units with men in them.

=== Women's Army Corps ===
The Women's Army Corps (WAC) would see service in Vietnam during the war. The size of the Women's Army Corps was dramatically smaller than in World War 2.

Less than 800 women are known to have served in the Women's Army Corps during the Vietnam War era from 1966 to 1973 in Vietnam. In Vietnam they were posted at Tan Son Nhut Air Base, Long Binh Post and hotels in the South Vietnamese capitol of Saigon. Women were motivated to join for a variety of reasons including: patriotism, to aid in the war effort, financial and educational reasons along with not wanting to get immediately married after completing high school. Recruitment was done in a variety of ways such as with museum exhibits and women's magazines.

Members of the WAC were generally not armed. They primarily served in non-combat roles (administration, logistics, intelligence, medical services, and communications). Their work supported key military operations, especially at Military Assistance Command, Vietnam (MACV) and United States Army, Vietnam (USARV) headquarters. Many were decorated for meritorious service, and the WAC detachment received two unit commendations for its contributions to the war effort.

=== Nurses ===
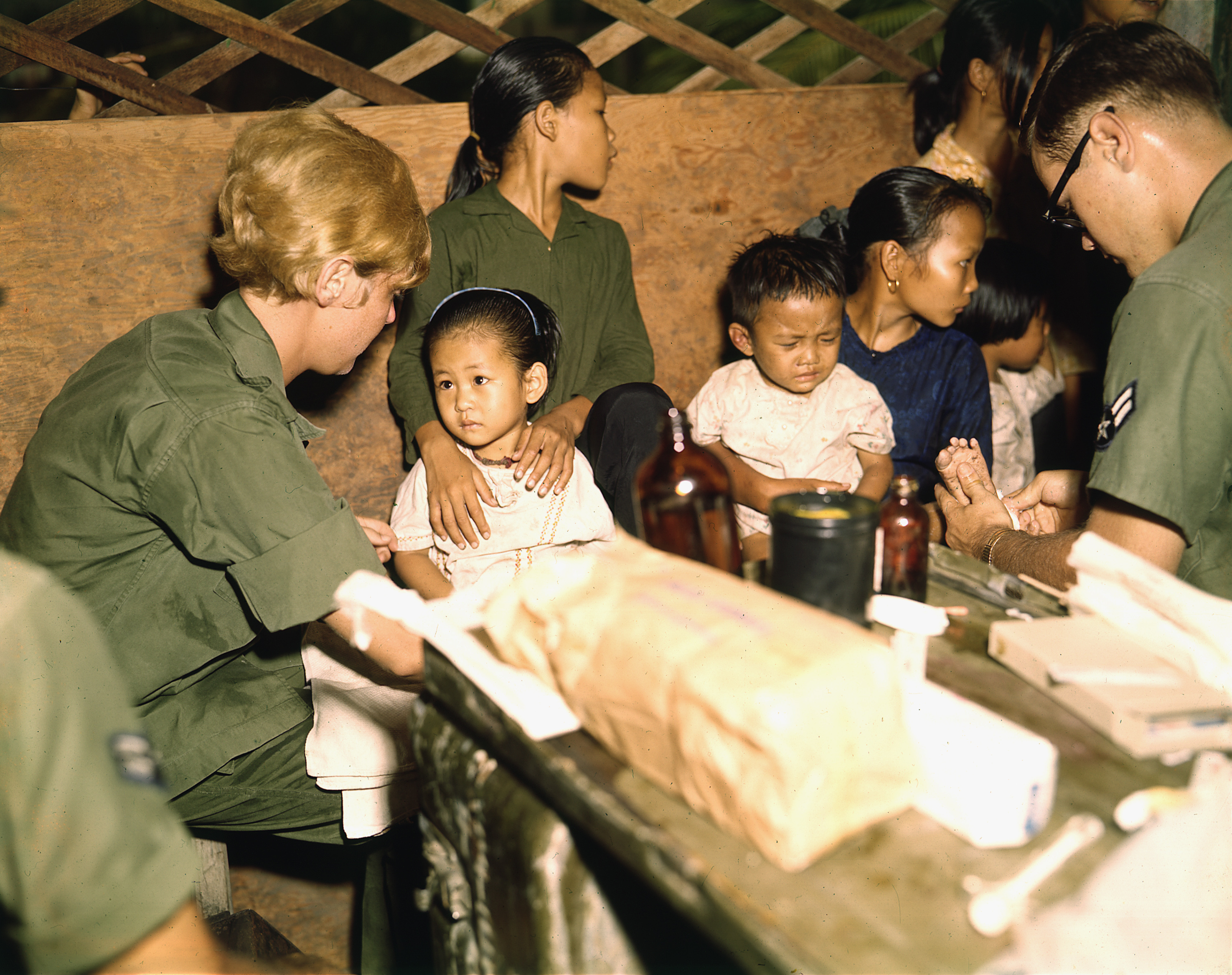
Second Lieutenant Kathleen M. Sullivan treats a Vietnamese child, 1967.

Over 11,000 women served in the American military during the War, the majority of whom were military-trained, graduate nurses. Most were fresh out of college and had volunteered their service while other more experienced nurses were sent to Vietnam to assist in training many South Vietnamese women. The first group of US Army nurses arrived in Vietnam in 1956, and by 1973 nearly 5,000 American women would be serving in Vietnam.

In addition to the Army nurses, there were some women who served as US Navy and US Air Force nurses. The first members of the Navy Nurse Corps arrived in Saigon in 1963, and were each awarded the Purple Heart after they were injured during the Christmas Eve 1964 Brinks Hotel bombing in Saigon. They were the first American females to be decorated with that award. In 1966, sixteen Air Force nurses arrived in Vietnam. During the war, there were only nine women who served in a role other than as a nurse, including Lieutenant Elizabeth Wylie, who worked as a Commander of Naval Forces in the Vietnam Command Information Center alongside Commander Elizabeth Barret who become the first female naval line officer to hold command in an official combat zone.

Working conditions as a nurse were often hard, with many nurses working a minimum of 12 hours a day, six days a week, in field hospitals that had little air conditioning. With the use of helicopters to transport soldiers in and out of combat zones quickly, front line nurses often could only stabilize injured soldiers before sending them off to better equipped hospitals away from combat. Nurses also had to perform duties beyond just physical care – one nurse described "we didn't just take care of their physical wounds. Any nurse who has served in any war zone would tell you that. We were their emotional support system. We were their mother, their wife, their girlfriend, their sister. You listened a lot, did a lot of hand-holding, comforting."

American nurses were also often expected to conform to a certain level of femininity, with Officer, Nurse, Woman: The Army Nurse Corps in the Vietnam War author Kara Dixon Vuic stating that: "She might have been a progressive nurse, specialized, and treated equally, but she was still needed for her touch, smile, and reassuring beauty. She was still needed to restore a sense of domesticity to the troops... Women who joined the military had long faced stereotypes and rumors about their sexuality, and so military leaders wanted to offer a positive image of nurses that would assure young women and their families that joining the military would be a positive move." Nurses also faced sexual assault from male soldiers. An instance of sexual harassment involved the misdirected sexual attraction toward nurses, which was partly fueled by the presence of female singing and dancing troupes. In Officer, Nurse, Woman: The Army Nurse Corps in the Vietnam War, Nurse Susan Kramer O’Neill recalls: “I don't know how helpful it is for a bunch of horny GIs to get a show that's pitched at the gonads, as it were... Because it's like a petting zoo; you can look, but... you can't touch." The performances encouraged inappropriate comments from soldiers toward O’Neill. However, she notes that at the time, such behavior wasn’t considered sexual harassment: “You're over there with all these guys, that's the way it works." In addition, American nurses stationed in newly built hospitals often became targets of unwanted attention from helicopter pilots. At the 18th Surgical Hospital in Pleiku, the women’s showers were constructed without roofs, leading some pilots to fly over them, effectively turning the nurses into unwilling objects of voyeurism.

In 1951, President Harry S. Truman issued Executive Order 10240, allowing the U.S. Armed Forces to "involuntarily discharge a woman if she became pregnant, gave birth to a child, or became a parent by adoption or a stepparent." Although regulations technically permitted these women to request retention, in practice, many were denied the opportunity. As a result, some felt pressured to undergo abortions, choose adoption, or suicide. An estimated 7,000 servicewomen were discharged under these rules. It wasn’t until 1975 that a legal challenge brought by Stephanie Crawford argued that this policy violated constitutional rights. Following this, the military officially repealed all pregnancy-related discharge regulations in 1976. In 1972, the American Department of Defense rescinded a policy that discharged women who got pregnant after Susan Struck, a nurse serving in Vietnam, sued over her dismissal, being represented by American Civil Liberties Union lawyer Ruth Bader Ginsburg.

Due to the efforts of the nurses, many American soldiers were able to survive the war, with the Vietnam Center and Sam Johnson Vietnam Archive of Texas Tech University stating that "98% of the men who were wounded and made it to the hospital survived." American nurses played a significant role in Operation Babylift, a mass evacuation of children from South Vietnam to the United States and other countries before the Fall of Saigon.

=== R&R Flights ===
In February 1966, the Pan Am airline secured an exclusive contract with the American government to operate rest and recreation flights for American soldiers in Vietnam. By 1967, over a dozen Pan Am aircraft were involved in the flights, the airline making on average 18 flights a day. The American flight attendants who served on those flights were named second lieutenants to be able to claim Geneva Convention protections in case of capture, some seeing as many as 200 flights into combat zones. Unlike the male pilots of the flights, the flight attendants did not receive hazardous-duty pay.

One flight attendant described their uniforms:

Our stewardess uniforms were made of fabric that was supposed to be "all weather", which really meant that it was too hot in summer and too thin in winter. Add to that the fact that we were still required to wear stockings and girdles, and I think you can imagine our discomfort.

Another described the experience:

We worked hard to make our military passengers happy with meals of steak, milk and ice cream. We wanted to help the war effort and the young men who were, for a few short hours, in our care. We chatted, mailed letters, listened to tales of lovers left behind and comrades felled by sniper fire from an unseen enemy. Most of the soldiers had never seen the evasive "Charlie", who disappeared down tunnels, scrambled across the Cambodian border and hid silently in the trees. We ignored the fact that most of the men would seek comfort in women forced into prostitution by poverty and sexism. The military even supported this, enlisting an American expat to build a hotel and brothel in Singapore. We were deluding ourselves that a steak and a few kind words could ever make up for the waste of life, the pain, the young men exploited for cannon fodder.

A number of women also served as flight attendants with the Flying Tiger Line.

=== American casualties and memorials ===
Eight American servicewomen, all of whom were nurses (seven Army nurses and one Air Force nurse), died during the war. Those eight women’s names (Eleanor Grace Alexander, Pamela Dorothy Donovan, Carol Ann Drazba, Annie Ruth Graham, Elizabeth Ann Jones, Mary Therese Klinker, Sharon Ann Lane, and Hedwig Diane Orlowski) are on the Vietnam Veterans Memorial wall.

The only servicewoman killed in action was First Lieutenant Sharon Lane; the rest died of accidents and illness. Lane died from a shrapnel wound after her hospital was hit by an enemy rocket in Chu Lai Base Area. Lane was awarded a posthumous Bronze Star Medal with "V" device and Republic of Vietnam Gallantry Cross with Palm (both for heroism) and a Purple Heart. During the war, one Air Force woman, an Air Force flight nurse, was killed in the 1975 Tân Sơn Nhứt C-5 accident.

59 American women who served as civilians (including nurses) in Vietnam were also killed and died in that war. 4 were POWs. In 1962 Eleanor Ardel Vietti became America’s first woman POW in Vietnam. She is currently the only American woman unaccounted for from the Vietnam War.

In March of 1965 one Barbara Robbins working for the CIA as a stenographer/secretary was caught in an explosion at the Embassy in Saigon. She was recruited from Colorado State University, serving for two years. Her death was disclosed to her family but not declassified until 2011. She was the first female CIA member to die in the line of duty.

In 1984, the Vietnam Women's Memorial Project was founded by Diane Carlson Evans, leading to the creation of the Vietnam Women's Memorial in Washington D.C. in 1993. The Vietnam Women's Memorial is in Constitution Gardens, a park on the National Mall. It honors the American women who served in the Vietnam War.

In 1980, Vietnam Veterans of America founded its Women's Project.

== Peace campaigners ==
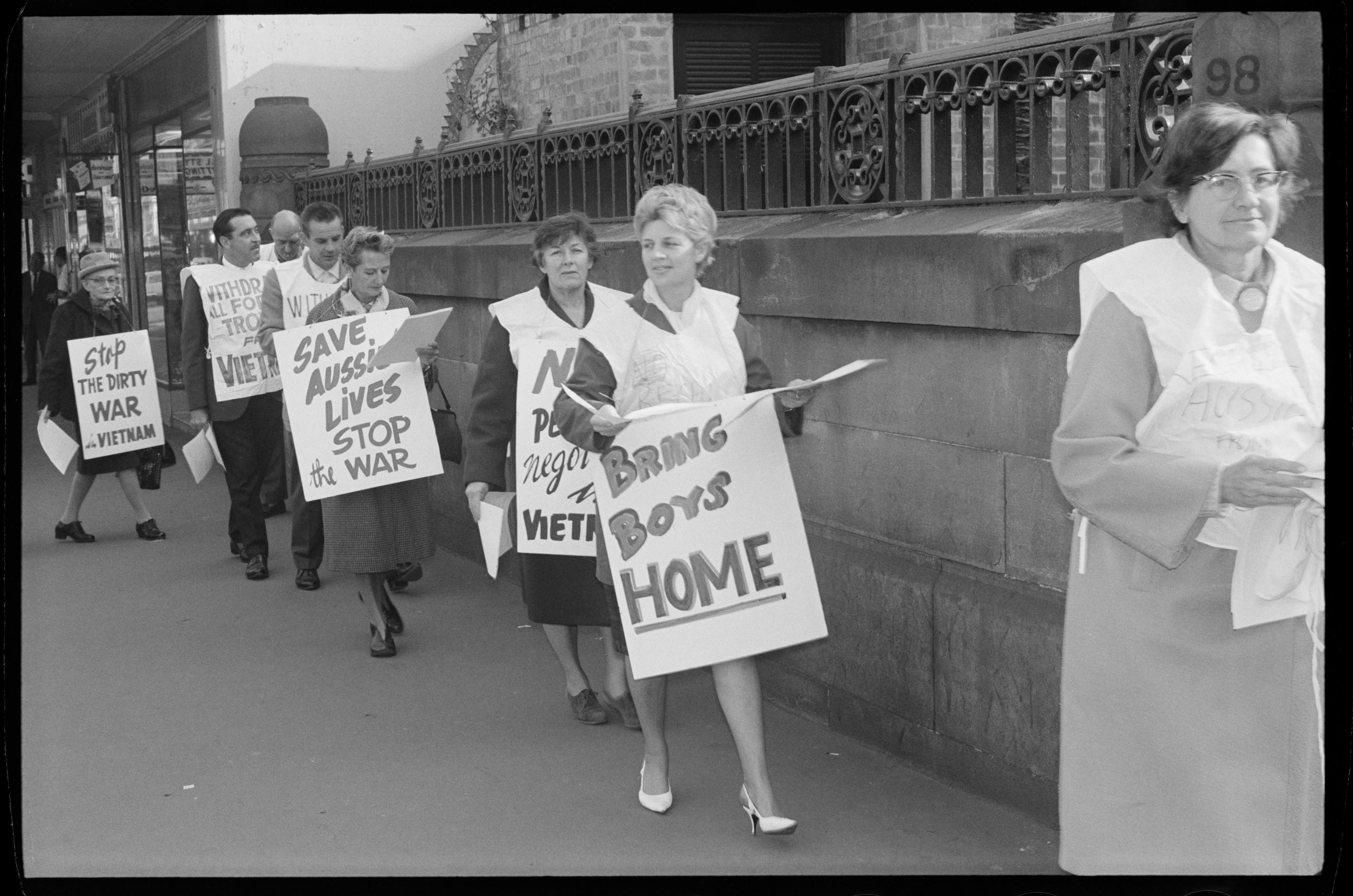
Anti-war protest in Australia, April 1965

Women played a significant role in anti-war movements, despite facing sexism in those movements and sometimes being relegated to second-class status within organizations. However, participation in antiwar groups allowed women to gain experience with organizing protests and crafting effective antiwar rhetoric. These newfound skills combined with their dislike of sexism within the opposition movement caused many women to break away from the mainstream antiwar movement and create or join women's antiwar groups, such as Another Mother for Peace, Women's International League for Peace and Freedom (WILPF), and Women Strike for Peace (WSP). Women also significant roles in general anti-war groups, such as the Committee of Concerned Asian Scholars. Female soldiers serving in Vietnam joined the movement to battle the war and sexism, racism, and the established military bureaucracy by writing articles for antiwar and antimilitary newspapers.

In 1965, Mary Clarke and Lorraine Gordon of WSP illegally traveled to Hanoi to meet with North Vietnamese leaders and the Vietnamese Women’s Union. Their visit defied the U.S. State Department bans and was kept secret to avoid political backlash. By creating these connections, they engaged in grassroots diplomacy, showing solidarity across enemy lines. Their actions helped humanize the Vietnamese to the American public and challenged the narrative that only state actors could influence foreign policy.

A number of Buddhist women, such as Chân Không and Nhat Chi Mai, were prominent figures in anti-war movements in South Vietnam. The Vietnamese Women's Movement for the Right to Live was also a significant force in South Vietnamese opposition to the war.

In Australia in 1965, a group of fifteen women in Sydney founded Save Our Sons to oppose conscription into the Australian military. In 1971, five Save-Our-Sons women were jailed in Melbourne for handing out anti-conscription pamphlets whilst on government property. The group, which included Jean Maclean, Irene Miller and Jo Maclaine-Ross, was dubbed "The Fairlea Five" after Fairlea women's prison in which they were incarcerated.

In Canada, the anti-nuclear Canadian Voice of Women for Peace lobbied the Canadian government to launch peace initiatives against the War. In February 1965, they met with Paul Martin Sr., the Canadian Secretary of State for External Affairs. In 1968, Ursula Franklin and Muriel Duckworth presented a brief to a House of Commons committee asserting that Canada and the United States had entered into military trade agreements without adequate public debate. In 1971, the Vancouver Indo-Chinese Women's Conference was held in protest of the War.

Cooperation between women's anti-war organisations on both sides of the conflict, however, sometimes faced difficulties due to differing goals and strategies. Jessica M. Frazier of the University of Rhode Island noted on meetings held between the WSP and the Vietnam Women's Union (VWU) beginning in 1965 that the former wished to emphasise the connection of "women's potential motherhood to their "natural" roles as nonviolent peace advocates" whereas the latter "saw their active participation in the revolutionary struggle for their country as central to their roles as mothers".

== Journalists ==
Many women worked as journalists during the war, breaking significant coverage of it and its effects and breaking down gender barriers in what was still a profession heavily dominated by men. The Atlantic journalist George Packer has stated that "Vietnam became the first war in which women had a fighting chance as reporters. The difficulty of gaining acceptance forced them to find their own way, which led to groundbreaking work."

Frances FitzGerald gained prominence for focusing her reporting on the effects of the war on South Vietnamese politics and society, unlike most of the male journalists, who tended to focus on combat operations. Kate Webb gained prominence for the fearlessness of her reporting, at one point in 1971 even being held prisoner by People's Army of Vietnam troops and seeing a number of newspapers print premature obituaries. In 1968, Catherine Leroy became the first freelancer and first woman to win the George Polk Award from the Overseas Press Club for her photography of the war.

Women journalists also faced government censorship over their reporting and helped lead fights against such censorship, such as The Village Voice reporter Judith Coburn having her visa revoked by the South Vietnamese government and New York Times reporter Gloria Emerson being repeatedly pressured by the American embassy and senior NYTimes editors. Ann Bryan Mariano, who covered the War for German tabloid Overseas Weekly, sued the American government after it attempted to ban the paper from being published across the Pacific region, winning the case in 1967.

On 4 November 1965, during an Operation Black Ferret patrol in Quang Ngai Province, Dickey Chapelle became the first female war correspondent to be killed in Vietnam, as well as the first American female reporter to be killed in action in history.

=== Discrimination against women journalists ===
Despite their accomplishments, women journalists in Vietnam often faced discrimination and harassment because of their gender. Jurate Kazickas, who covered the war as a freelancer after quitting her job at Look magazine and winning enough money to buy a ticket to Saigon on the Password game show, described how officers would invite her to dinners instead of front line missions and that "I was a freelancer and I was female and that's like a double whammy. You know – get out of here. The male press corps did not really show any kind of respect." Denby Fawcett, who had quit her job at the Honolulu Star-Bulletin after the paper refused to assign her to Vietnam, also described facing difficulties getting permission to accompany troops to combat zomes:

One of the first officers I asked turned me down, saying I reminded him of his daughter. I swallowed hard in frustration, knowing the same commander would never say to a male reporter, 'You remind me of my son.'

Elizabeth Becker, who began covering the War in 1973, stated that "the work of the women I looked to as role models has gradually slipped away from public memory" and that:

For self-protection as well as the cultural conditions of the era, the women of the Vietnam War did not tell their stories. Male journalists who wrote memoirs about their time during the war either left out the women or belittled their accomplishments, no matter how many awards the women had won.

Upon becoming American commander in Vietnam in 1964, General William Westmoreland issued the so-called Westmoreland Edict that banned women from staying with troops overnight, effectively barring female reporters from accompanying troops to the front lines. The edit lasted until 1967, when journalist Anne Morrissy Merick successfully campaigned to have it overturned. In 1971, Edith Lederer became the first woman to head a foreign bureau for the Associated Press, but only after intervention from the AP president, as the AP's foreign editor refused to hire women, as he thought they wouldn't be capable of withstanding the pressures of situations of war and disaster.

=== Legacy of women journalists ===
A number of books have been released on the women who served as journalists during the war, such as War Torn: Stories of War from the Women Reporters Who Covered Vietnam, which was published in 2002 and interviewed nine women who covered the war. In 2008, Joyce Hoffmann published a book titled On Their Own: Women Journalists and the American Experience in Vietnam. In 2015, Jeannine Baker published Australian Women War Reporters: Boer War to Vietnam In 2021, Elizabeth Becker published You Don't Belong Here: How Three Women Rewrote the Story of War.

In 2017, it was announced that Carey Mulligan was due to star in a film based on Kate Webb's On the Other Side: 23 Days With the Vietcong.

=== Portrayal of women in Vietnam War journalism ===
Portrayals of gender featured significantly in journalistic portrayals of the war. Karen Slattery and Ana Garner of Marquette University have argued that press coverage of American mothers during the War differed from coverage of mothers during previous wars, away from an archetype of a mother who "raised her son to be a warrior and told him, as he went off to war, to return with his shield or on it" towards one of "the peacetime good mother, who cares for her children and resists sending them into harm's way."

However, journalistic coverage of the war has faced criticism over its portrayal of Vietnamese women. Warren Wilson College professor Jeffrey A. Keith notes that "Vietnam War-era print journalism on Saigon exhibited thematic continuity with colonial writings about the city. Like their predecessors, Western correspondents often described Saigon as a feminized place largely defined by sensual pleasure."

== Women of other nationalities ==
=== Australia ===
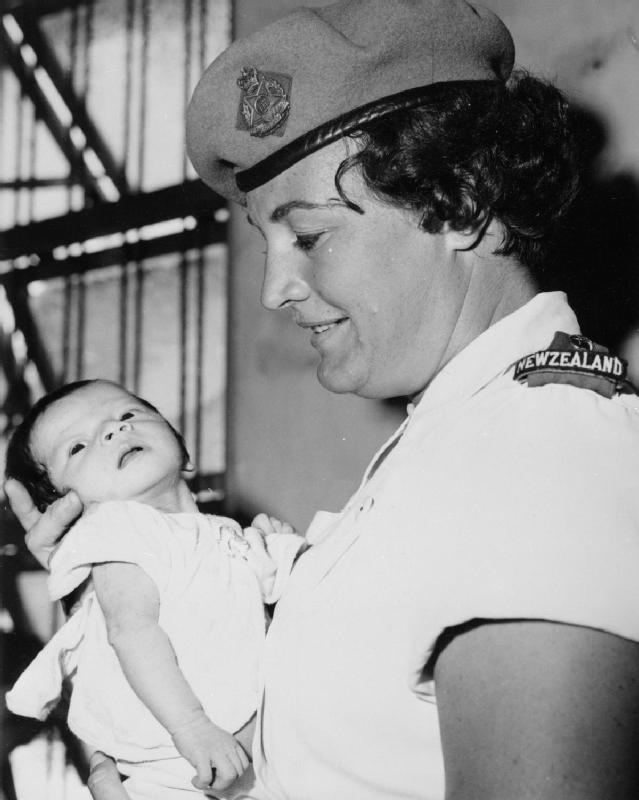
Charge Sister Pam Miley, a Royal New Zealand Nursing Corps Sister at an orphanage in Vung Tau, Headquarters of the 1st Australian Logistic Support Group, 1971.

Virtually all of more than 340 military and civilian nurses attached to Australian forces in Vietnam during the war were women. In addition, Australian women worked in Vietnam with NGOs organisations like the Red Cross, in non-nursing roles. At least 200 Australian civilian nurses, 100 Royal Australian Air Force nurses and 43 Royal Australian Army Nursing Corps nurses served in Vietnam, however, the true number that served might be higher, as nurses not only faced pressures to remain quiet about their roles due to anti-war sentiment, but were also ordered by the Australian government to stay silent and saw the government refuse to publicly recognise their contributions. One Australian nurse died during the Vietnam, Lieutenant Barbara Black, who died of disease in 1971. In 1993, the Committee of Inquiry Into Defence Awards found that nurses who had served in Vietnam should be awarded the Vietnam Medal. In 2016, Annabelle Brayley released a book titled Our Vietnam Nurses on Australian nurses in Vietnam.

=== Other countries ===
A number of South Korean nurses also served during the War.

In the 1960s, North Korea provided some support to the North Vietnamese, with the Korean Democratic Women's Union (KDWU) issued statements of solidarity and making a number of visits to Vietnam. However, the KDWU tended to emphasise traditional roles of Vietnamese women as mothers instead of as revolutionary fighters. Benjamin Young of the Woodrow Wilson International Center for Scholars notes that "North Korea's focus was on liberating Vietnam the nation, not the women of Vietnam."

== Post-war ==
Vietnamese women who fought during the War have faced discrimination upon returning to civilian life. As many women veterans were young and had been forbidden from entering into relationships during the war, upon the end of the war they were caught in a situation where traditional societal values expected them to get married and looked down on unmarried women but where they were shunned from relationship out a perception that the scars they bore from battle made them less desirable and too weak to bear children. Official government histories of the War have also tended to erase the contributions women veterans made and those veterans have often faced difficulties accessing government benefits.

8,040 Vietnamese women came to the United States as war brides between 1964 and 1975. Many mixed-blood Amerasian children and their mothers were left behind when their American fathers returned to the United States after their tour of duty in South Vietnam. Those left-behind families have faced increased levels of discrimination and poverty. 26,000 of those children and several thousand more of their relatives were permitted to immigrate to the United States in the 1980s and 1990s.

Women in the Indochina refugee crisis faced high rates of sexual violence, including being raped and kidnapped by Thai and Malay pirates, who attacked many of the small boats used by refugees.

The Vietnam War saw some of the heaviest bombing campaigns in history and many unexploded ordnances and mines remain throughout Vietnam, Cambodia, and Laos. Women have contributed to de-mining and defusing initiatives.

The War also saw the widespread use of chemical defoliants by the American military, such as Agent Orange, which continue to affect the landscape, cause diseases and birth defects, and poison the food chain. French-Vietnamese woman Tran To Nga, a journalist and former Viet Cong soldier, has led campaigns against the manufacturers of the defoliants.

== In popular culture ==
=== Literature ===
In 2005, the diaries of Đặng Thùy Trâm, who worked as a battlefield surgeon for the People's Army of Vietnam and Vietcong from 1966 to her death in 1970, were published, selling over 300,000 copies in less than a year.

In 2024, Kristin Hannah's novel The Women was published, telling the story of a fictional American nurse in the Vietnam War.

=== Film ===
A number of films about the war have featured women as main characters, although less than feature men. The 1975 Vietnamese film Girl from Hanoi was filmed during the war, after a bombing raid on Hanoi, and features a young girl who lost her family in raid looking for her soldier father. The 1984 Vietnamese film When the Tenth Month Comes, named "one of the greatest Asian films of all times" by CNN, centers around the misery of a young woman whose husband has died in the war. The 1989 musical Miss Saigon is Broadway's thirteenth longest-running show.

After making the 2017 documentary series The Vietnam War, directors Ken Burns and Lynn Novick stated that "one of the revelations of the project was how much women were on the [North Vietnamese] front lines... These women were so proud of their service and so tough," and remarked that when retired American general Merrill McPeak had previewed the documentary, he "had no idea that he had been bombing some of the women that were repairing the trail".

=== Portrayals in popular culture ===
Depictions of women in fictional media, however, have been marked by a degree of misogynistic tropes and portrayals, often portraying Vietnamese women as hypersexual, submissive, and mired in backwards poverty, in a war environment of extreme masculinity. Philip K. Jason of the University of Manitoba stated that, in fiction: "not only are the old stereotypes played out — in Vietnam, women were once again and forever either mothers, wives, angels, whores or some painful combination — but the literature of this war sets up hideous and totally convincing equations in which women become both enemy and weaponry." Vietnamese-American novelist Viet Thanh Nguyen has stated that "Ever since Puccini's 1904 opera Madame Butterfly, Asians have been portrayed in romantic terms as self-sacrificing women who prefer white men to Asian men, and who willingly die for the love of white men. A more brutal version of this orientalist fantasy is found in many American movies about the war in Vietnam."

The attitudes of popular portrayals of the War towards feminism have also been criticised. In her 1989 book, The Remasculinization of America: Gender and the Vietnam War, Susan Jeffords argued that fictional representations of the war tended to re-assert traditional gender norms against rising feminist progress.

The role of women in the War has also at times been overlooked and minimised, with Vietnamese women in the war often only portrayed as either helpless victims, grieving mothers, or as prostitutes, if portrayed at all. New York Times reporter Gloria Emerson described an interaction she had after a college lecture in which she spoke of her experiences of the war:

A young woman came up to me and solemnly said: 'I'm so glad a woman was there to see it.' Her remark so shocked me that I turned my back on her. It was as if she was dismissing all the Vietnamese women whose lives were deformed by the war, the many Vietnamese women in the South who risked torture and death in opposing the Americans and their Vietnamese allies; and the American nurses who cared for the wrecked soldiers.

== See also ==
- Women in Vietnam
- Vietnamese Women's Museum
- Women in the military
- Women in journalism
- Home Before Morning
- Dương Thu Hương
- Lê Minh Khuê
