= Canton South High School =

Coordinates: 40.749859°N 81.373108°W

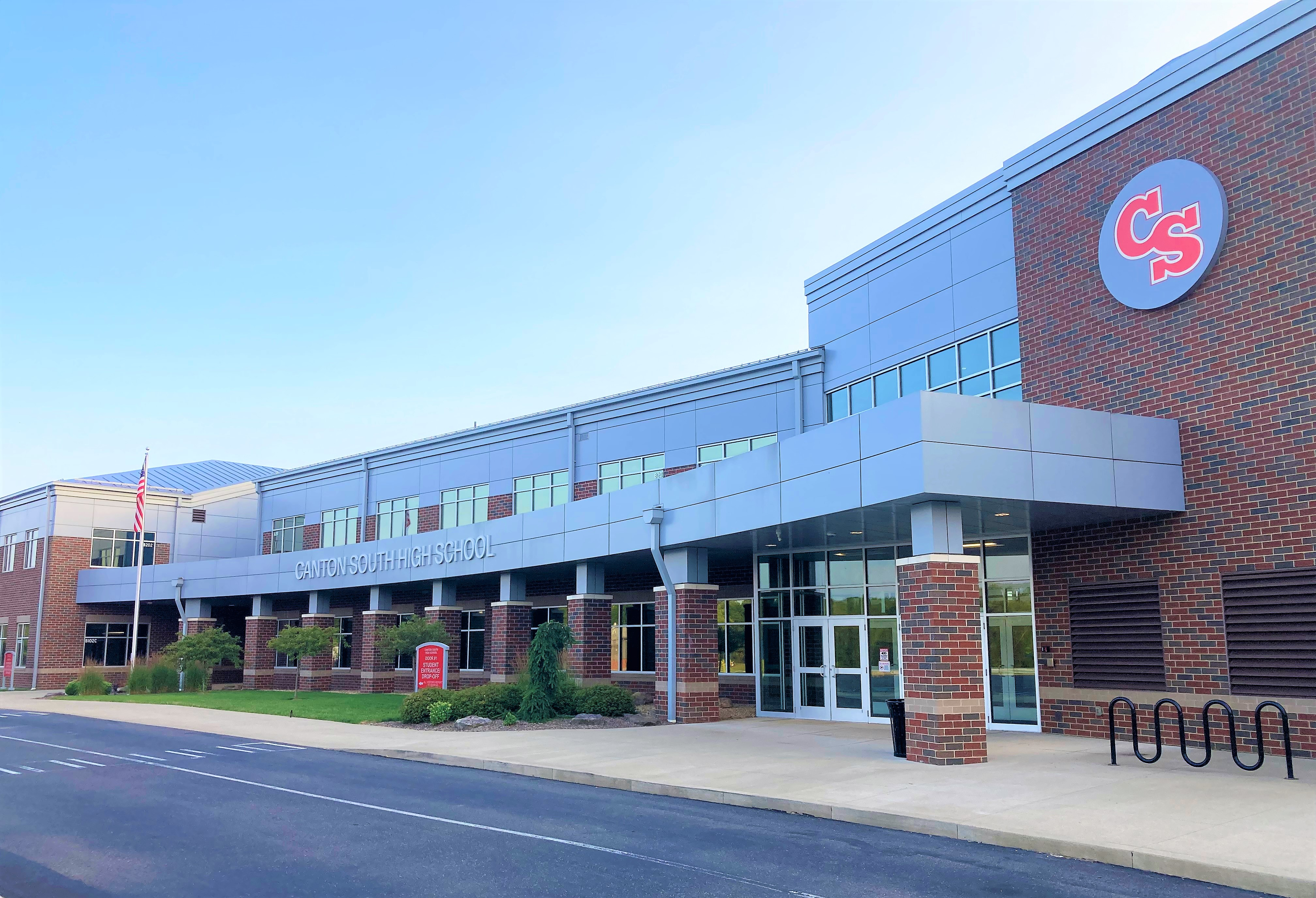
- New Canton South High School.

Location
- 600 Faircrest Street S.E. Canton, Ohio 44707; United States

Information
- School type: Public high school
- Founded: 1932
- School board: Stark County Educational Service Center
- School district: Canton Local Schools
- Superintendent: Larry Tausch
- Principal: Krysta Gearhart
- Teaching staff: 35.00 (FTE)
- Grades: 9–12
- Enrollment: 814 (2023-2024)
- Student to teacher ratio: 23.26
- Language: English
- Campus: Suburban
- Colors: Red and gray
- Mascot: Willie the Wildcat
- Communities served: North Industry, Canton Township, and Pike Township
- Website: cshs.cantonlocal.org

Canton South High School is a public high school in Canton Township, Stark County, Ohio. it is the only high school in the Canton Local Schools District. Their nickname is the Wildcats, and they compete in the Principles Athletic Conference as member of the Ohio High School Athletic Association

== History ==
Canton South High School opened in 1932, and serves students grades 9-12

The original Canton South High School stood from 1932 until 2017. In 2013, a levy was voted in favor of building a new high school that would begin construction in 2015 citing that the old building was outdated and had structural issues that needed to be addressed. The new school would stand adjacent to the old high school.

Canton Souths new high school began operation in the 2017-18 school year, their old high school would be demolished the same year.

== Notable alumni ==
- Dick Cunningham, former NBA player
- Dirk Hayhurst, former MLB player
- Howard Jolliff, former NBA player
- Sharon Ann Lane, U.S. military nurse
- Devon Torrence, former NFL player
- Larry Snyder (athlete), Jesse Owens's college coach
