= Devon Torrence =

American baseball and gridiron football player (born 1989)

Free agent
- Outfielder
- Born: May 8, 1989 (age 37); Canton, Ohio, U.S.
- Bats: Switch Throws: Right

Devon Torrence
Profile
- Position: Cornerback

Personal information
- Listed height: 6 ft 0 in (1.83 m)
- Listed weight: 190 lb (86 kg)

Career information
- College: Ohio State
- NFL draft: 2011: undrafted

Career history
- Minnesota Vikings (2011)*; Cincinnati Bengals (2011)*; New York Jets (2012)*; Montreal Alouettes (2013)*
- * Offseason or practice squad member only
- Stats at Pro Football Reference

Devon M. Torrence (born May 8, 1989) is an American professional baseball outfielder. He also played American and Canadian football as a cornerback in the National Football League (NFL) and Canadian Football League (CFL). Torrence signed with Minnesota Vikings as an undrafted free agent in 2011. He was also a member of the Cincinnati Bengals, New York Jets and the Montreal Alouettes. He played college football at Ohio State.

== Early life ==
Torrence attended Canton South High School in Canton, Ohio. Torrence was selected to the first-team all-conference in his last three years of high school. Torrence also played wide receiver, safety and running back during high school.

College recruiting
Name	Hometown	School	Height	Weight	40^{‡}	Commit date
Devon Torrence; Safety	Canton, Ohio	Canton South High School	6 ft 0 in (1.83 m)	200 lb (91 kg)	4.4	Sep 1, 2006
Devon Torrence; Safety	Recruit ratings: Scout: Rivals:					
Overall recruit ranking: Scout: 12 (Safety) Rivals: 24 (ATH), 8 (OH)
Note: In many cases, Scout, Rivals, 247Sports, On3, and ESPN may conflict in their listings of height and weight.; In these cases, the average was taken. ESPN grades are on a 100-point scale.; Sources: "Ohio State Football Commitments". Rivals.; "2007 Ohio State Football Commits". Scout.; "Scout.com Team Recruiting Rankings". Scout.; "2007 Team Ranking". Rivals.com.

== College career ==
Torrence played football at Ohio State. In all 4 years in Ohio State, he finished with 99 tackles, 4 interceptions, 5 forced fumbles, one sack.

In his freshman year, on September 8, 2007, he played at Wide receiver in which he had one reception for no yards against Akron as Ohio State wins 20–2.

In his sophomore year, on October 18, 2008, he recorded one tackle and a forced fumble against Michigan State as Ohio State wins 45–7.

In his junior year, on September 5, 2009, he recorded 2 tackles in the season opener against Navy as Ohio State wins 31–27. On September 12, 2009, he recorded 8 tackles and one sack against No. 3 USC but Ohio State loss 18–15. On September 19, 2009, he recorded one tackle against Toledo in a shutout victory 38–0. On September 26, 2009, he recorded 3 tackles against Illinois as Ohio State won the game 30–0. On October 3, 2009, he recorded a tackle and a forced fumble against Indiana as Ohio State wins 33–14.

In his senior year, on September 11, 2010, he recorded 8 tackles and a pass deflection against Miami (FL) and Ohio State won 36–24. On September 18, 2010, he recorded 1 tackle and 2 pass deflections against Ohio as Ohio State wins 43–7. On September 25, 2010, he just recorded 2 tackles against Eastern Michigan as Ohio State wins 73–20. On October 2, 2010, he recorded 3 tackles against Illinois and Ohio State wins 24–13. On October 9, 2010, he recorded one tackle, an interception and 2 passes defended against Indiana as Ohio State wins 38–10. On October 16, 2010, he recorded 6 tackles and passes defended against No. 18 ranked Wisconsin but Ohio State loss 31–18.

== Baseball career ==
=== Houston Astros ===
Torrence was drafted by the Houston Astros in the 16th round, with the 501st overall selection, of the 2007 Major League Baseball draft. Torrence played two seasons as an outfielder for their rookie-level affiliate, the Greeneville Astros of the Appalachian League. In two seasons with Greenville, he played in 64 games, in which he had 5 runs batted in, a batting average of .150, 7 stolen bases and a slugging percentage of .170.

=== Kansas City Royals ===
On February 16, 2014, Torrence signed a minor league contract with the Kansas City Royals. He played in only one game for the rookie-level Idaho Falls Chukars, going 1-for-4 (.250). On June 28, Torrence was released by the Royals.

=== Florence Freedom ===
In July 2014, Torrence signed with the Florence Freedom of the independent Frontier League, but only appeared in two games for the team.

=== Lancaster Barnstormers ===
On April 9, 2019, Torrence signed with the Lancaster Barnstormers of the Atlantic League of Professional Baseball. In 97 games for Lancaster, he batted .227/.294/.277 with two home runs, 23 RBI, and 26 stolen bases. Torrence became a free agent following the season.

Torrence re-signed with the team on March 6, 2020, but the season was later canceled as a result of the COVID-19 pandemic. On February 20, 2021, Torrence re-signed with the Barnstormers. In 105 appearances for the team, he batted .258/.317/.317 with no home runs, 26 RBI, and 16 stolen bases.

On March 29, 2022, Torrence once again re-signed with the Barnstormers. In 48 games for Lancaster, Torrence slumped to a .198/.375/.245 line with no home runs and 7 RBI. He was released by the team on August 4.

=== Charleston Dirty Birds ===
On August 5, 2022, Torrence signed with the Charleston Dirty Birds of the Atlantic League. In 37 appearances for Charleston, he batted .216/.312/.291 with one home run, nine RBI, and 16 stolen bases. Torrence became a free agent following the season.

== Professional football career ==
Pre-draft measurables
Height	Weight	Arm length	Hand span	40-yard dash	20-yard shuttle	Three-cone drill	Vertical jump	Broad jump
6 ft 0 in (1.83 m)	199 lb (90 kg)	30 3/8 in (0.77 m)	9 in (0.23 m)	4.68 s	4.82 s	6.95 s	33.0 in (0.84 m)	111 ft 0 in (33.83 m)
All values from the NFL Combine

=== Minnesota Vikings ===
On July 28, 2011, Torrence signed with Minnesota Vikings as an undrafted free agent. He played all four preseason games and recorded two tackles on defense and two on special teams. Torrence was waived prior to the season on September 2.

=== Cinncianti Bengals ===
On December 19, 2011, the Cincinnati Bengals signed Torrence to their practice squad. On January 2, 2012, he was waived by the Bengals.

=== New York Jets ===
On August 1, 2012, Torrence signed with New York Jets. On August 14, he was released by the Jets.

=== Montreal Alouettes ===
On June 14, 2013, Torrence signed with the Montreal Alouettes of the Canadian Football League. On June 21, he was released by the team just before the 2013 CFL season began.

=== The Spring League ===
Torrence participated in The Spring League in 2017.
