= Diane Carlson Evans =

American army nurse (1946–2026)

Captain Diane Carlson Evans
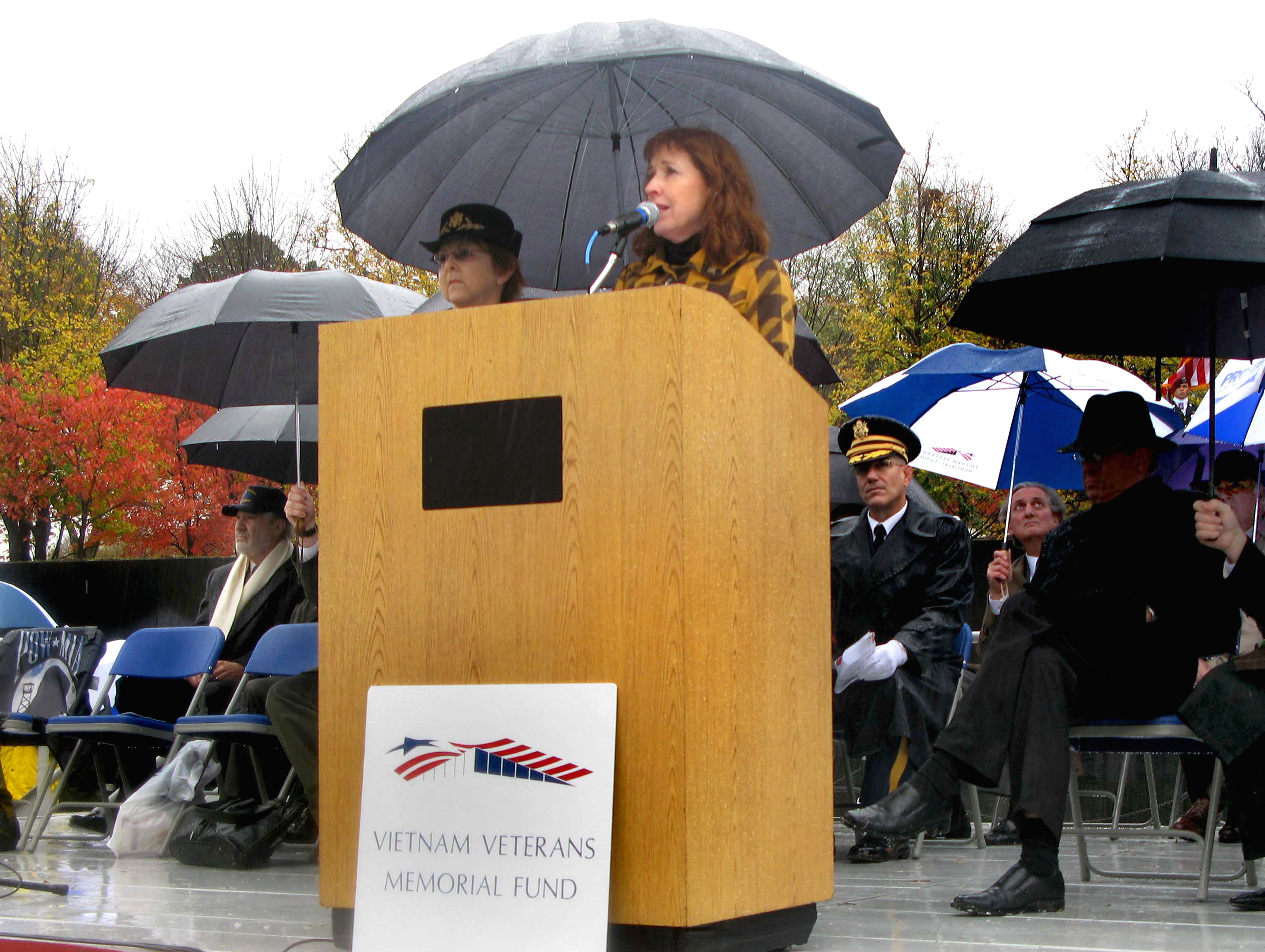
- Carlson Evans speaking on Veterans Day 2009
- Born: November 10, 1946; Buffalo, Minnesota, U.S.
- Died: May 20, 2026 (aged 79); Helena, Montana, U.S.
- Occupation: Nurse
- Years active: Vietnam War
- Medical career
- Institutions: United States Army
- Notable works: Founder of the Vietnam Women's Memorial
- Awards: National Association of State Directors of Veterans Affairs "Advocate of the Year" Award

Diane Carlson Evans (née Diane Althea Carlson; November 10, 1946 – May 20, 2026) was a nurse in the United States Army during the Vietnam War and the founder of the Vietnam Women's Memorial Foundation, which established the Vietnam Women's Memorial located at the Vietnam Veterans Memorial on the National Mall in Washington, D.C. In 1984, with the help of Minneapolis Sculptor Rodger M. Brodin, and Vietnam veterans Donna-Marie Boulay and Gerald C. Bender, the Vietnam Women's Memorial Project was founded. Evans initiated and led the effort to completion.

== Biography ==
=== Military service ===
Carlson Evans was born Diane Althea Carlson in Buffalo, Minnesota, on November 10, 1946. She was raised on a dairy farm in rural Minnesota and graduated from nursing school in Minneapolis, Minnesota. Upon graduation, she joined the Army Nurse Corps and served in Vietnam, at age 21, in 1968–1969. She served in the burn unit of the 36th Evacuation Hospital in Vung Tau and at Pleiku in the 71st Evacuation Hospital, 30 miles from the Cambodian border in the Central Highlands, just 10 to 20 minutes by helicopter from the field. Including her one year in Vietnam, Carlson Evans completed a total of 6 years in the Army Nurse Corps.

=== Vietnam Women's Memorial campaign ===
Carlson Evans attended the dedication of the Vietnam Veterans Memorial (the "wall") in 1982. Following the dedication of the statue of three soldiers at the Vietnam Veterans Memorial in 1984, Carlson Evans founded the Vietnam Women's Memorial Project, to honor the service of American military women who served during the Vietnam War era. She worked from 1984 through 1993 to establish the Vietnam Women's Memorial, lobbying federal authorities for permission to build a memorial to the 11,000 military women who served in Vietnam and the 265,000 who served around the world during the Vietnam era. Carlson Evans and thousands of volunteers in 50 states raised money and public support for the cause, including from leading veteran's organizations, including the Veterans of Foreign Wars, Vietnam Veterans of America, Disabled American Veterans, and the American Legion. At the time of dedication, the VWMP was about $600,000--$700,000 short of required funds, and the corporation which underwrote the amount, provided the needed last-minute cash.

It took seven years of testimony before three federal commissions and two congressional bills for Evans and her supporters to earn permission for the memorial. Once permission was granted, more than 300 artists entered a major design competition in 1990. Sculptor Glenna Goodacre, of Santa Fe, New Mexico, submitted a design that received honorable mention and was selected as the statue that replaced the design "Nurse" by Rodger Brodin which was used as a fundraiser during the early days of awareness-raising; the model for "Nurse", with which thousands fell in love and which raised the first million dollars toward the Project, was Rhonda McKellup, a 26-year-old sheriff's office dispatcher in Minnesota. The Goodacre statue now stands on the National Mall in Washington, D.C. The bronze sculpture is 7'0" tall with four figures, 3 nurses and a wounded soldier. One of the nurses is kneeling, holding a helmet in her hand. One nurse is shown cradling the wounded soldier, a hand clasped over his injury. The third nurse is standing guard. The Vietnam Women's Memorial was dedicated before a crowd of thousands on November 11, 1993, with remarks from then Vice President and Vietnam Veteran Al Gore.

=== Career from 1993 ===
Following the dedication of the Vietnam Women's Memorial in 1993, Carlson Evans remained active in the veterans community. As Founder and President of the Vietnam Women's Memorial Foundation, she spoke nationally about the experience of women in wartime.

In 2004, on behalf of a citizens' group called the Helena Patriot Committee, Carlson Evans presented to the City Commission of Helena, Montana, a statement in favor of a resolution in opposition to the U.S. Patriot Act.

=== Personal life and death ===
Carlson Evans and her husband of over 40 years had four children and seven grandchildren. She died from cancer at her home in Helena, Montana, on May 20, 2026, at the age of 79.

== Awards and honors ==
Evans was honored for her work from many organizations and institutions. Awards and honors include:

- Honorary Degree: Doctor of Humane Letters from Haverford College, Pennsylvania
- Honorary Degree: Doctor of Humane Letters from Sacred Heart University, Fairfield, Connecticut
- Honorary Degree: Doctor of Humane Letters from Carroll College, Helena, Montana
- Honorary Doctorate from University of Indianapolis
- National Association of State Directors of Veterans Affairs "Advocate of the Year" Award
- Governor's Excellence Award, State of Minnesota
- "Outstanding Civic Achievement Award" by the USO, Washington, D.C.
- "Vietnam Veteran of the Year" award from the Wisconsin Vietnam Veterans of America
- "Woman Agent of Change" by the AAUW (American Association of University Women)
- "Woman of Distinction" by the National Conference for College Women Student Leaders
- "Woman of the Year, Jesse Bernard Award" by the Center for Women's Policy Studies, Washington, D.C.
- "National Special Service Award" by BRAVO (Brotherhood of all Veterans Organizations)
- "Veteran of the Year Award" by VIETNOW
- "Service to Mankind" Award by the SERTOMA Club
- "Gold Medal of Merit" by the Veterans of Foreign Wars
- The Lillian D. Wald "Spirit of Nursing" Award, New York City
- World T.E.A.M. Sports Hall of Fame Inductee
- Sigma Theta Tau International Award
- Montana Amnesty International Human Rights award
- Lifetime Memberships were awarded to Ms. Evans from The American Legion, Veterans of Foreign Wars, Disabled American Veterans, and Vietnam Veterans of America.
- The Presidential Citizens Medal (2025)
