= Vietnam Women's Memorial =

Memorial in Washington, D.C.

Coordinates: 38.8904°N 77.0469°W

- Vietnam Women's Memorial photographed by Carol M. Highsmith
- Interactive map of Vietnam Women's Memorial
- Location: West Potomac Park, Washington, D.C., U.S.
- Designer: Glenna Goodacre (sculptor); George Dickie (landscape architect); Art Castings of Colorado (founder)
- Material: Bronze (sculpture); Granite (base)
- Length: 5.8 ft (1.8 m)
- Width: 7.9 ft (2.4 m)
- Height: 6.7 ft (2 m)
- Dedicated date: November 11, 1993
- Dedicated to: American women in the Vietnam War
- Website: vietnamwomensmemorial.org

The Vietnam Women's Memorial is a memorial dedicated to the nurses and women of the United States who served in the Vietnam War. It depicts three uniformed women with a wounded male soldier to symbolize the support and caregiving roles that women played in the war as nurses and other specialists. It is part of the Vietnam Veterans Memorial and is located on the National Mall in Washington, D.C., a short distance south of the Wall and north of the Reflecting Pool. The statues are bronze and the base is made of granite. The United States Commission of Fine Arts and the National Capital Planning Commission selected Glenna Goodacre to sculpt the memorial after previously rejecting the idea for a memorial to women.

Diane Carlson Evans, a former U.S. Army nurse, co-founded the Vietnam Women's Memorial Foundation (VWMF) in 1984 with two other veterans. It took years of lobbying and attending dozens of meetings for the memorial to finally be approved. With assistance from members of Congress, VWMF was granted permission in 1988 to erect the memorial, as long as the necessary funds were raised. At the dedication on Veterans Day in 1993, Vice President Al Gore and other dignitaries were in attendance, along with approximately 25,000 onlookers. Since then, there have been numerous anniversary gatherings at the memorial.

== History ==
=== Memorial plans ===
In 1982, Diane Carlson Evans, who served as a U.S. Army nurse during the Vietnam War, attended the dedication of the Vietnam Veterans Memorial. Noting the memorial's focus on men who served during the war, she wanted to also memorialize the more than 11,500 American women who served as nurses and in other roles. Two years later, she and two other veterans, attorney Donna-Marie Boulay and Gerald C. Bender, formed the Vietnam Women's Memorial Foundation (VWMF), whose goal was to erect a memorial to the women who assisted in the war. In addition to the memorial, the group's other goals was locating all women veterans of the war, and educating the public about their sacrifices.

Their idea was repeatedly turned down for the next several years. The women were mocked and received death threats. According to Evans, she discovered how much misogyny they would have to overcome to meet their goal. One person told Evans that if women were to be memorialized, so would the Canine Corps. Television journalist Morley Safer from 60 Minutes heard about the reference to dogs and invited several women who had served in Vietnam to be interviewed. The response was positive, and some male veterans began offering their services to assist the project's approval. Evans attended over 35 meetings with bureaucrats to seek approval for the monument.

In 1987, the United States Commission of Fine Arts (CFA) overwhelmingly rejected the proposal, despite a letter of support from Secretary of the Interior Donald P. Hodel. Members of the VWMF were angry with the decision, citing it as proof only men were apparently worthy of being honored for their service. In addition to the CFA, the memorial would have to be approved by the National Capital Planning Commission (NCPC). The CFA's reasons for denying the project was because, in their view, the memorial was already complete and the Three Soldiers statue represented all who served. Veteran Jill A. Mishkel, who worked on the Connecticut governor's Task Force on Women Veterans, said "To the majority of Americans, the word 'veteran' implies 'male.' The statue of three men representing women's contributions is ludicrous. It's an insult that the commission even suggested recognizing us with a plaque on a park bench." Maya Lin, who had designed the Wall, opposed the women's memorial, giving credence to other opponents of the plan. According to Lin, "In allowing this addition you substantiate the assumption that our national monuments can be tampered with by private interest groups years after the monuments have undergone the proper legal and aesthetic approval processes."

In response to the CFA's rejection, U.S. senators David Durenberger and Alan Cranston sponsored a bill to erect the memorial. They were joined by U.S. House Representative Sam Gejdenson in sponsoring a House version of the bill. Durenberger said Public Law 96-297, signed in 1980 by President Jimmy Carter, authorized a memorial in Constitution Gardens to both men and women who served in Vietnam. The design that was sponsored in the bill was of a lone woman nurse in uniform. This design, by Rodger M. Brodin, was criticized as it was too plain and only represented an officer. After years of lobbying and with the help of the aforementioned politicians, the VWMF succeeded in getting the U.S. Senate to approve a "woman's statue" on June 15, 1988, that would be installed in Arlington National Cemetery instead of the Constitution Gardens.

The bill was signed by President Ronald Reagan in November 1988. In a statement from the White House, Reagan said the statue would be installed somewhere in the 2.2-acre (0.9 ha) area where the Vietnam Veterans Memorial and Three Soldiers are located. The bill recognized the Commemorative Works Act, which states the CFA and NCPC must approve new memorials in the city. The CFA and NCPC approved the plan the following year, and chose a site south of the Wall for the memorial. By 1990, the VWMF had raised almost half of its goal of $3.5 million. A competition for a new design began in August of that year, with the winner receiving $20,000.

There were 317 entries for the design. The sculptor chosen was Eileen Barry, who submitted a design of a bronze woman facing the Wall. Also included in the winning design was a water feature and bronze relief. The design then headed back to the CFA and NCPC for final approval. Those groups could not agree on the design, so the eventual winner was Glenna Goodacre, selected in November 1991. It was announced the dedication would be in 1993, as long as the VWMF raised the remaining funds, which they eventually did. The person chosen to design the landscape was architect George Dickie, and the Art Castings of Colorado founded the memorial. Before the memorial was dedicated, organizers took the sculpture on a tour across the U.S.

=== Dedication ===
External videos
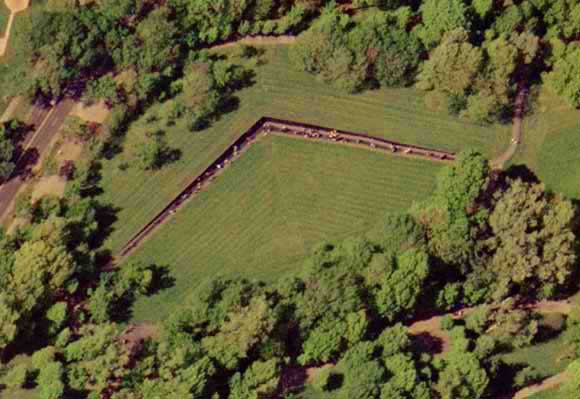
- Vietnam Women's Memorial Dedication in 1993, C-SPAN

On Veterans Day, 1993, around 25,000 people gathered to attend the memorial's dedication, including Vice President Al Gore, former chairman of the Joint Chiefs of Staff William J. Crowe, and several other military leaders. Many in attendance were veterans who shared their stories of Vietnam and reunited with women they served with during the war. One woman in attendance, whose son was killed in Vietnam, said "They took care of our kids ... Maybe somebody here today took care of my boy before he died."

A Marine in attendance, who had lost both legs during battle in Vietnam, was upset the memorial was installed 300 feet (91 m) south of the Wall, insisting it should be closer "because these women were the last people those guys saw or talked to before they died." In addition to the dedication ceremony, there were many other events marking the occasion. Two such events were a women's march down Constitution Avenue, which was met with cheers from male veterans, and a visit to Arlington National Cemetery, where a wreath was laid at the Tomb of the Unknown Soldier. According to the United States Department of Defense, the women's memorial "was the first in the nation's capital to exclusively recognize the patriotic service of [American] women, both military and civilian." The memorial is owned and maintained by the National Park Service.

=== Later history ===
Since its installation, the memorial has been the site of annual gatherings to mark its anniversary. Around the time of the 20th anniversary in 2013, Evans and the Vietnam Veterans Memorial Fund wanted an underground education center that would cover not just the women's memorial, but the Three Soldiers and the Wall as well. The plan to build the education center, called The Education Center at The Wall, was cancelled in 2018 due to a lack of funding. At the 25th anniversary in 2018, there was a candlelight remembrance ceremony, a storytelling program for children, and multiple speakers. During the 30-year anniversary in 2023, another candlelight ceremony took place at the memorial, and the keynote address was given by Evans.

== Location and design ==
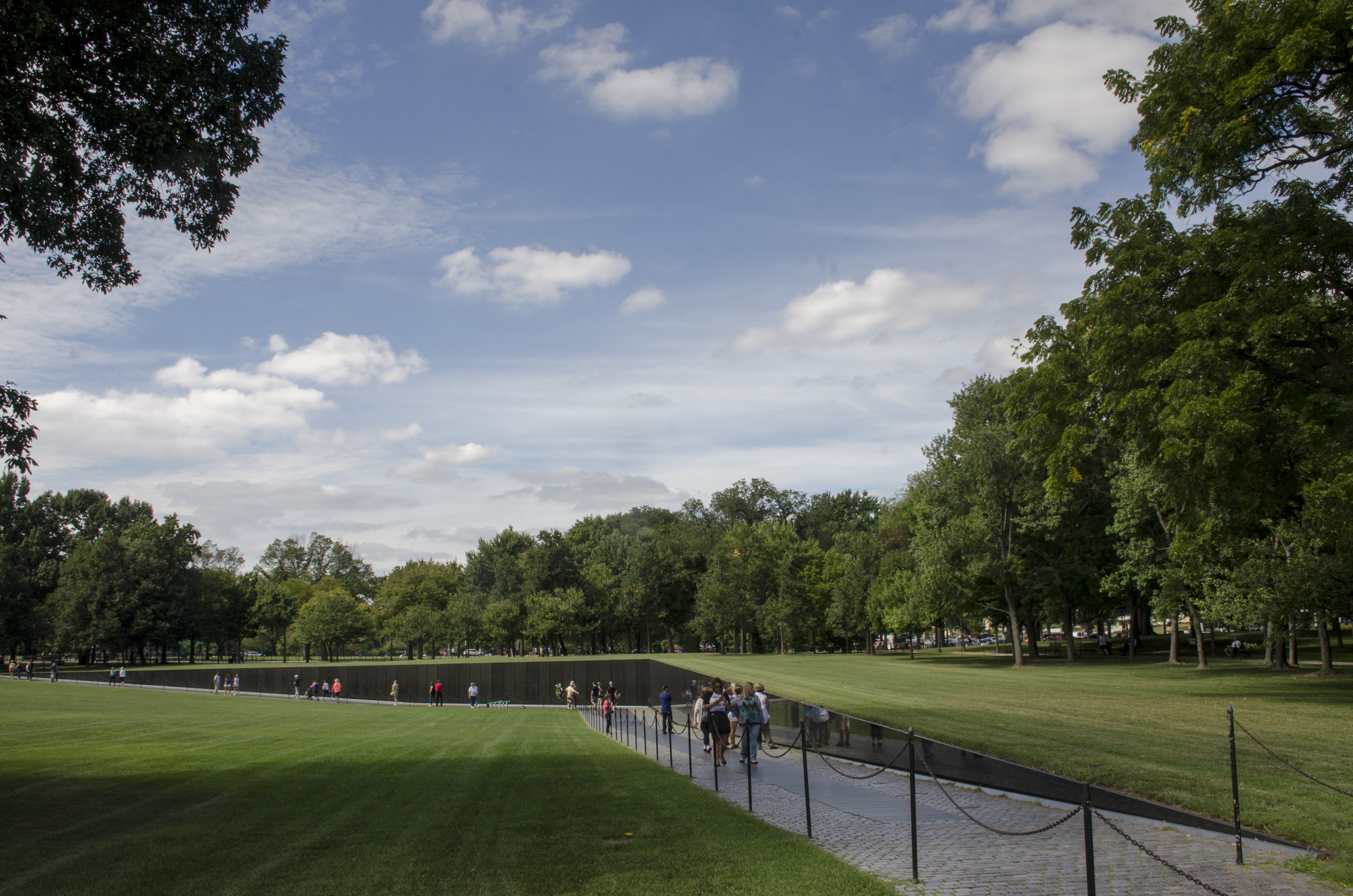
The Wall at the Vietnam Veterans Memorial, which is just north of the Vietnam Women's Memorial

The memorial is sited near the Wall and the Three Soldiers statue at the Vietnam Veterans Memorial. The three groupings of the memorial are in Constitution Gardens, a park on the National Mall in Washington, D.C. The Lincoln Memorial lies to the southwest, the Lincoln Memorial Reflecting Pool to the south, and Constitution Avenue to the north. Landscape architect George Dickie chose the site of the Vietnam Women's Memorial based on three important factors: a location where the Wall was visible from the Memorial; accessibility to the Memorial; and a good fit and addition to the existing park layout and Constitution Gardens.

The memorial is composed of four bronze statues resting on a granite base. The sculpture is approximately 6.7-feet (2 m) tall, 7.9-feet (2.4 m) wide, and 5.8-feet (1.8 m) long. The base is 8-inches (20.3 cm) tall and the diameter is around 9.7-feet (3 m). Inscriptions on the sculpture include "Glenna Goodacre Sculptor/(copyright symbol)", "1993 Vietnam Women's Memorial Project, Inc.", and the foundry's mark. Three of the statues are women nurses in uniform assisting a wounded soldier. One of the women is sitting on sandbags, holding the soldier. Another is holding the soldier's helmet while kneeling. The third woman is African American and is standing while looking up towards the sky. The surrounding landscape includes eight yellowwood trees that represent the eight American servicewomen who died during the Vietnam War: Eleanor Grace Alexander, Pamela Dorothy Donovan, Carol Ann Drazba, Annie Ruth Graham, Elizabeth Ann Jones, Mary Therese Klinker, Sharon Ann Lane, and Hedwig Diane Orlowski. The only servicewoman killed in action was Lane; the rest died of accidents and illness.

The memorial has been criticized for historical inaccuracy as "it depicts nurses giving medical care on the field of battle, such care was only given by U.S. Army medics and U.S. Navy corpsmen, with nurses working exclusively in military hospitals."

== See also ==
- List of public art in Washington, D.C., Ward 2
- Women in the Vietnam War
