= Sharon Ann Lane =

US Army nurse in the Vietnam War

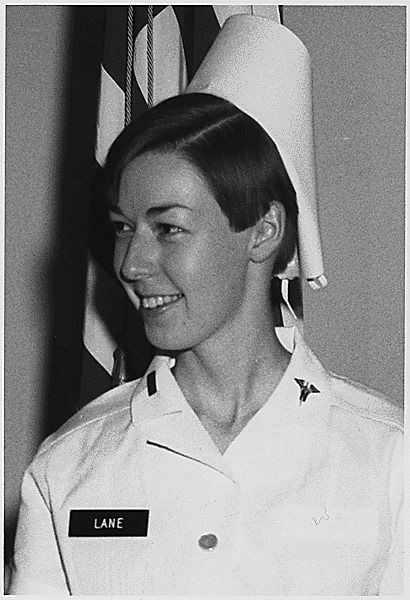
- Born: July 7, 1943; Zanesville, Ohio, US
- Died: June 8, 1969 (aged 25); Chu Lai, Republic of Vietnam
- Burial place: Sunset Hills Burial Park, Canton, Ohio, US; 40°51′19.2″N 81°26′29.2″W
- Alma mater: Aultman Hospital School of Nursing
- Military career
- Allegiance: United States of America
- Branch: Army
- Service years: 1968–1969
- Rank: First Lieutenant
- Units: 312th Evacuation Hospital, 67th Medical Group, 44th Medical Brigade
- Campaigns: Vietnam War: Tet 69 / Counteroffensive †
- Awards: Bronze Star Medal with "V" device; Purple Heart

Sharon Ann Lane (July 7, 1943 – June 8, 1969) was a United States Army nurse and the only American servicewoman killed as a direct result of enemy fire in the Vietnam War. The Army posthumously awarded Lane the Bronze Star Medal for heroism on June 8, 1969.

== Biography ==
Sharon Ann Lane's graduation photo from the Aultman Hospital School of Nursing

Sharon Ann Lane was born in Zanesville, Ohio, the daughter of John and Mary "Kay" Lane. When she was two, the family moved to North Industry, Ohio. In June 1961, she graduated from Canton South High School in Canton, Ohio. In September, Lane entered the Aultman Hospital School of Nursing in Canton and graduated from there in 1965. She worked at the Aultman Hospital until May 1967, and then attended Canton Business College.

On April 18, 1968, Lane joined the US Army Nurse Corps Reserve. On May 5, she began her Army medical training at the Brooke Army Medical Center at Fort Sam Houston, Texas. She completed her training on June 14 and was commissioned a second lieutenant. On June 17, she reported to Fitzsimons General Hospital near Denver, and while on duty there was promoted to first lieutenant. In 1969, after volunteering for duty in South Korea or South Vietnam, she received orders for Vietnam and reported to Travis Air Force Base in California on April 24.

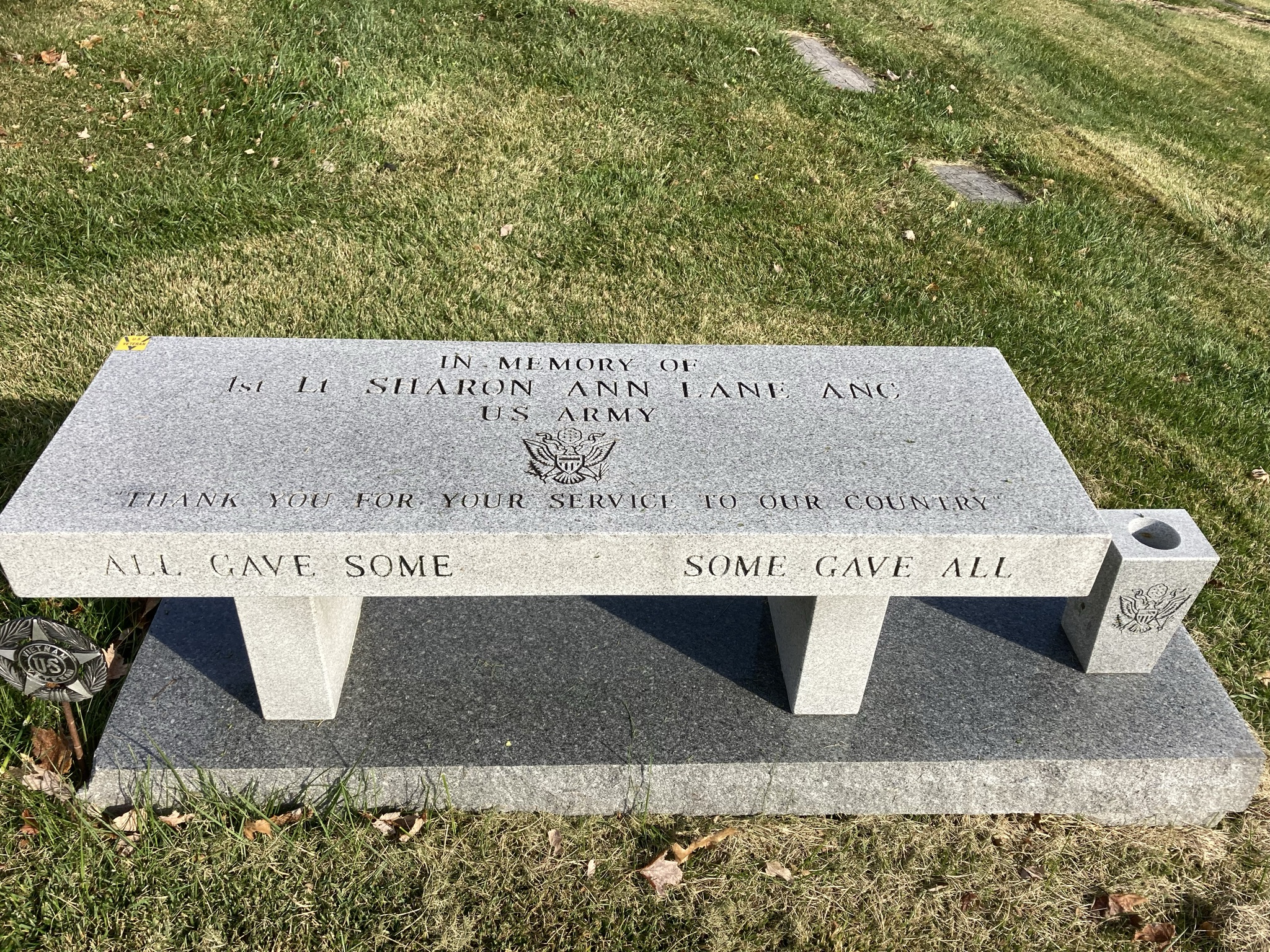
Grave site of Sharon Ann Lane located in Sunset Hills Burial Park in Canton Ohio.

Lane's tour in South Vietnam began on April 24, 1969. On April 29, she reported for duty at the Army's 312th Evacuation Hospital in Chu Lai where she was assigned as a general duty staff nurse to the Intensive Care and Vietnamese wards. On June 8, Chu Lai was hit by an enemy rocket attack and Lieutenant Lane was killed by a 122mm rocket that struck between two quonset huts of Vietnamese civilians, soldiers, and POWs, that formed the Vietnamese ward (Ward 4) where Lane last served. A Vietnamese child was also killed. The 312th Evacuation Hospital received an Army Meritorious Unit Commendation for the period October 1, 1968, to May 31, 1969.

A military funeral and burial was held for Lane on June 14, 1969, at Sunset Hills Burial Park in Canton, Ohio.

Of the roughly 11,000 American women who were stationed in South Vietnam, eight servicewomen (all nurses) died during the war. Among these, Lane was the only one killed by hostile fire.

== Awards and decorations ==

| Bronze Star Medal w/ Valor device | | Purple Heart |
| National Defense Service Medal | Vietnam Service Medal w/ 1 bronze campaign star | Vietnam Military Merit Medal |
| National Order of Vietnam (Knight) | Vietnam Gallantry Cross w/ Palm | Republic of Vietnam Campaign Medal |

| Army Meritorious Unit Commendation | Republic of Vietnam Gallantry Cross Unit Citation |

=== Bronze Star Medal with "V" device ===
First Lieutenant Lane was posthumously awarded the Bronze Star Medal with "V" device for her actions on June 8, 1969.

General Orders No. 598
July 4, 1969

Citation:

For heroism in connection with military operation against a hostile force. Lieutenant Lane distinguished herself by exceptional valorous actions during a rocket attack on the 312th Evacuation Hospital. Since her arrival at the hospital, her untiring efforts as a general duty staff nurse have made her ward a particularly outstanding one. It was through the application of rare foresight and sound principles of management that Lieutenant Lane overcame and minimized the problems inherent in providing medical support in a combat environment. As the sounds of the first incoming rockets reported throughout the hospital, Lieutenant Lane, thinking only of the welfare of her patients, rushed to her ward in an effort to protect her charges from harm. At this time, the ward took a direct hit from an enemy 122mm rocket. The resultant explosion produced metal fragments that struck Lieutenant Lane, taking her life. As a result of Lieutenant Lane's courageous actions in the face of adversity, total disaster to the ward was prevented and many lives were saved. Lieutenant Lane's personal bravery and devotion to duty were in keeping with the highest traditions of the military service and reflect great credit upon herself, her unit and the United States Army.

== Legacy ==
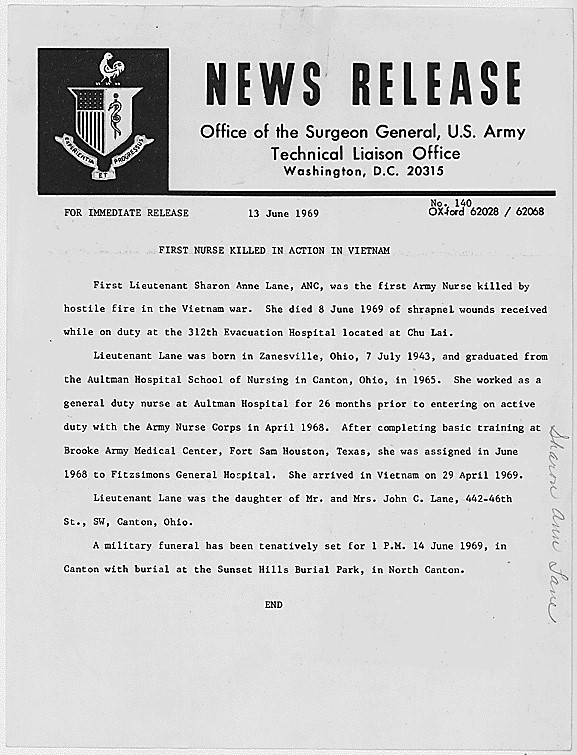
US Army press release on the death of Sharon Ann Lane

- Lane's name is on Panel 23W, Line 112 of the Vietnam Veterans Memorial Wall.
- The landscape surrounding the Vietnam Women's Memorial includes eight yellowwood trees that represent the eight American servicewomen who died during the Vietnam War - Lane, Carol Ann Drazba, Eleanor Grace Alexander, Pamela Dorothy Donovan, Annie Ruth Graham, Elizabeth Ann Jones, Mary Therese Klinker, and Hedwig Diane Orlowski. The only servicewoman killed in action was Lane; the rest died of accidents and illness.
- Veterans of Foreign Wars (VFW) Post 11920 at Evans, Georgia, was named the 1Lt Sharon A. Lane Memorial Post.
- In 1969, Lane was named Outstanding Army Nurse of the Year by the National Society of Daughters of the American Revolution.
- In 1970, Lane was posthumously presented the Dr. Anita Newcomb McGee Award by the National Society of Daughters of the American Revolution.
- In 1973, a life-size bronze statue of Lane was dedicated at Aultman Hospital School of Nursing's courtyard (moved later to the building's entrance) in Canton, Ohio.
- In 1986, the Vietnam Veterans of America Chapter 199 in Canton, Ohio, was named the Sharon Lane Memorial Chapter.
- In 1995, the volunteer center at Fort Hood, Texas, was named the Sharon Lane Volunteer Center.
- In 2001, the medical library in Evans Army Community Hospital at Fort Carson, Colorado, was named the Sharon A. Lane Medical Library.
- In 2002, a medical clinic built by the Sharon Ann Lane Foundation in Chu Lai (Tam Hiep Commune), Vietnam, was dedicated the Sharon Ann Lane Clinic.
- In 2003, Lane was inducted into the Ohio Military Hall of Fame in Columbus, Ohio (the hall of fame's exhibit is at Mott's Military Museum in Groveport, Ohio).
- In January 2019, a new exhibit about Lane was put up at the US Army Medical Department Museum at Joint Base San Antonio-Fort Sam Houston.
- A memorial marker was installed on the CU Anschutz Medical Campus in Aurora, CO.

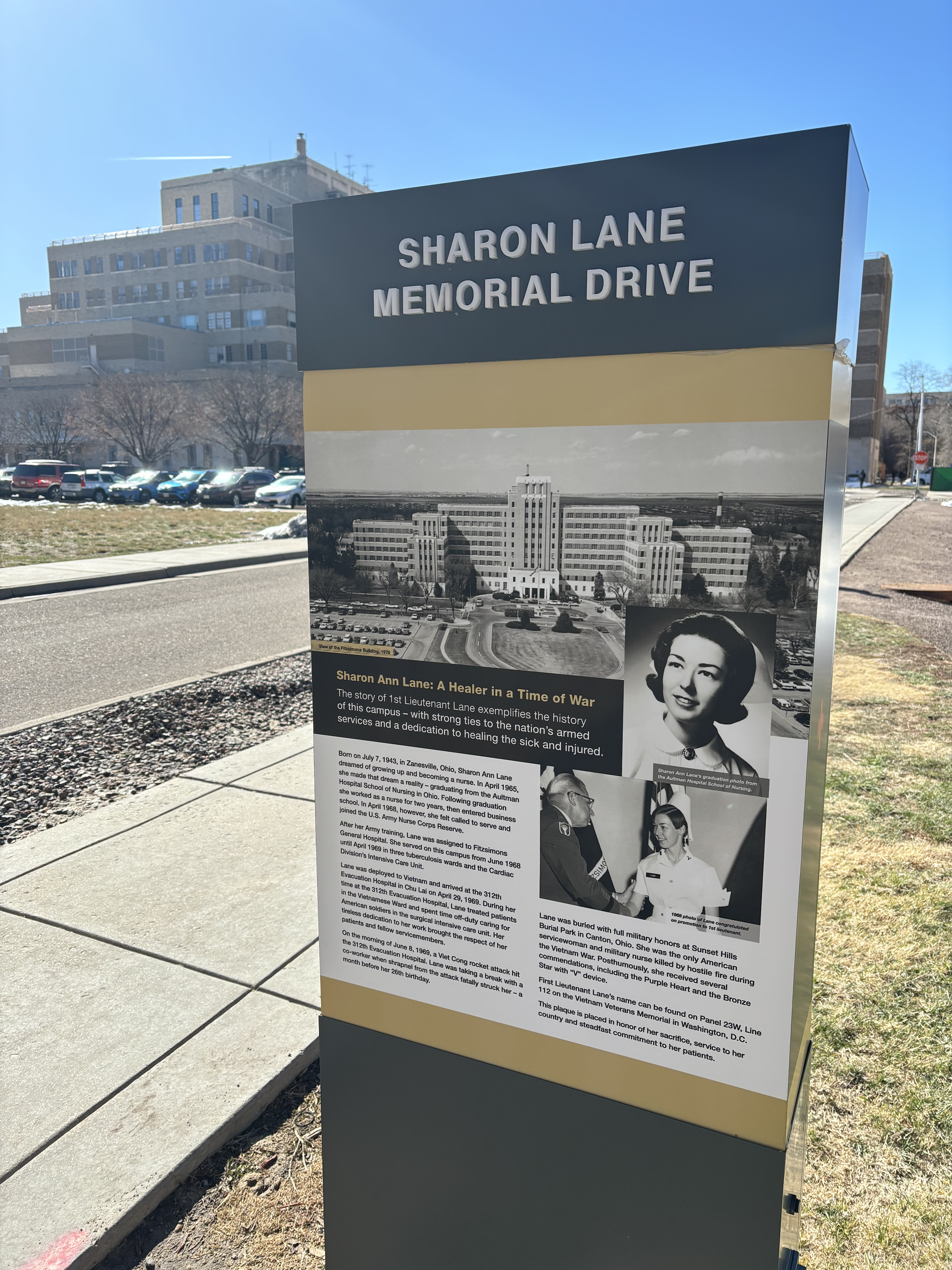
Memorial located on the University of Colorado Anschutz Medical Campus. Photographed March 18, 2024. Fitzsimons Army Hospital can be seen in the background.
