= Carol Ann Drazba =

American nurse (1943–1966)

- Drazba's nursing school photo, from the front page of the San Francisco Examiner, February 19, 1966.
- Born: December 11, 1943; Waterbury, Connecticut, U.S.
- Died: February 18, 1966 (aged 22); Thua Thien province, South Vietnam
- Cause of death: Helicopter crash
- Occupation: Nurse
- Known for: One of the first two American nurses to die in the Vietnam War

Carol Ann Elizabeth Drazba (December 11, 1943 – February 18, 1966) was one of the first two American nurses killed in the Vietnam War. She was from Dunmore, Pennsylvania and died in a helicopter crash.

== Biography ==
Drazba was born in Waterbury, Connecticut during World War II, the daughter of Joseph Drazba and Marcella Drazba. She graduated from Dunmore High School in 1961. She trained as a nurse at Scranton State General Hospital, graduating in 1964 as a registered nurse.

In 1965, Drazba went to South Vietnam with the Army Nurse Corps. She held the rank of second lieutenant, and served at the 3rd Field Hospital in Saigon. In February 1966, Drazba and another nurse, Elizabeth A. Jones, were among the seven American military personnel who died in a helicopter crash northeast of Tan Son Nhut Air Base, South Vietnam, when the helicopter hit electrical lines and burned. Drazba and Jones were the first two American women to die in the Vietnam War. Her remains were returned to the United States, and buried at Sacred Heart Cemetery in Scranton, Pennsylvania.

The Friends of the Forgotten and others pursued a posthumous Purple Heart decoration for Drazba in 2010. Their case rested on an alternative explanation for the helicopter's crash: if the helicopter was shot down instead of caught in wires, they suggested, Drazba's might be reclassified as a combat death, and qualify for a Purple Heart.

== Memorials ==
A scholarship fund in Drazba's memory was established at Dunmore High School in 1966.

In 1967, a memorial plaque about Drazba was placed at the Scranton State General Hospital, where she trained.

The Friends of the Forgotten erected a six-foot bronze statue in her honor in 2012, at the Gino J. Merli Veterans' Center, on the site of her former hospital in Scranton. The statue is surrounded by a space paved in bricks with dedication messages, an array of flags, and two polished stone benches, one dedicated to the four other Dunmore High School graduates lost in Vietnam, and one from the Friends of the Forgotten.

In November 2019, Elizabeth Warren sponsored Senate Resolution 415, requesting that the U. S. Postmaster General issue a commemorative stamp series in honor of women veterans. Drazba was named in the text of the resolution, as one of the examples of the sacrifices women in military service have made in the history of the United States.

Drazba's name appears on Panel 05E, Line 046, of the Vietnam Veterans Memorial Wall in Washington, D.C.

The landscape surrounding the Vietnam Women's Memorial includes eight yellowwood trees that represent the eight American servicewomen who died during the Vietnam War – Drazba, Eleanor Grace Alexander, Pamela Dorothy Donovan, Annie Ruth Graham, Elizabeth Ann Jones, Mary Therese Klinker, Sharon Ann Lane, and Hedwig Diane Orlowski. The only servicewoman killed in action was First Lieutenant Sharon Lane; the rest died of accidents and illness.
