= Stark County Educational Service Center =

School district in Ohio

Coordinates: 40°52′37″N 81°25′55″W

Stark County Educational Service Center is a school district located in Stark County, Ohio, United States.
