= Annie Ruth Graham =

American army officer and nurse (1916–1968)

- Born: Annie Ruth Graham; November 7, 1916; Efland, North Carolina, U.S.
- Died: August 14, 1968 (aged 51); Tachikawa, Tokyo, Japan
- Occupation: Nurse

Annie Ruth Graham (November 7, 1916 – August 14, 1968) was a U.S. Army officer who was the highest-ranked American servicewoman to die during the Vietnam War.

Lieutenant Colonel Graham was the chief nurse at the 91st Evacuation Hospital in Tuy Hòa. In August 1968, she suffered a stroke and was evacuated to Japan where she died four days later. She had been a veteran of both World War II and the Korean War. Graham was one of eight American servicewomen who died during the Vietnam War. She was buried at Arlington National Cemetery.

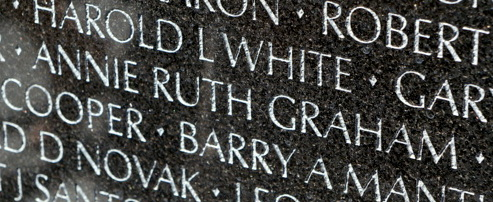
Graham's name on the Vietnam Veterans Memorial

Her name is on Panel 48W, Line 12 of the Vietnam Veterans Memorial Wall.

The landscape surrounding the Vietnam Women's Memorial includes eight yellowwood trees that represent the eight American servicewomen who died during the Vietnam War - Graham, Carol Ann Drazba, Eleanor Grace Alexander, Pamela Dorothy Donovan, Elizabeth Ann Jones, Mary Therese Klinker, Sharon Ann Lane, and Hedwig Diane Orlowski. The only servicewoman killed in action was First Lieutenant Sharon Lane; the rest died of accidents and illness.
