= Glenna Goodacre =

American artist (1939–2020)

- Born: Glendell Maxey; August 28, 1939; Lubbock, Texas, US
- Died: April 13, 2020 (aged 80); Santa Fe, New Mexico, US
- Education: Colorado College
- Occupation: Sculptor
- Notable work: Vietnam Women's Memorial
- Spouses: William Goodacre, C.L. Mike Schmidt (m. 1995)
- Children: 2, including Jill Goodacre

Glenna Maxey Goodacre (August 28, 1939 – April 13, 2020) was an American sculptor, best known for having designed the obverse of the Sacagawea dollar that entered circulation in the US in 2000, and the Vietnam Women's Memorial in Washington, D.C.

== Early life and career ==
Goodacre grew up in Lubbock, Texas, where her family had long been prominent. A 100-acre (40 ha) city park bears the name of her paternal grandfather, James Barney Maxey (1881–1953), who was a prodigious builder and civic leader in Lubbock and the South Plains. Goodacre's father, Homer Glen Maxey, was a builder, developer and civic leader in Lubbock. A graduate of Texas Tech University in 1931, he was the first president of the Red Raider Club, the school's athletics-booster organization. He served on the Lubbock City Council from 1956 to 1960.

Goodacre graduated from Monterey High School in Lubbock. She then completed studies at Colorado College and classes at the Art Students League in New York City. She moved to Santa Fe, New Mexico, in 1983.

== Art ==
Goodacre's art appears in public, private, municipal and museum collections throughout the U.S. Her bronze sculptures feature lively expression and texture. Her best-known work is the Vietnam Women's Memorial, installed in Washington, D.C., in 1993, of which there is smaller replica at Vietnam Veterans Memorial State Park in Angel Fire, New Mexico. Goodacre was selected in 1997 as sculptor for the monumental Irish Memorial in Philadelphia. Completed and installed at Penn's Landing in 2003, the massive bronze is her most ambitious public sculpture with 35 life-size figures. Another cast is at the National Cowboy & Western Heritage Museum in Oklahoma City. After a nationwide competition for a Sacagawea dollar coin design in 1999, Goodacre's rendering for the face was unveiled at the White House by then-First Lady Hillary Clinton.

In 2004, her bronze portrait of West Point Coach Colonel Earl "Red" Blaik was dedicated at the National College Football Hall Of Fame. In 2004, she also designed the Children's Medal of Honor awarded to then First Lady Laura Bush in Dallas by the Greater Texas Community Partners.

An academician of the National Academy of Design and a fellow of the National Sculpture Society, Goodacre won many awards at their exhibitions in New York. Goodacre has received honorary doctorates from Colorado College, her alma mater, and Texas Tech University in her hometown of Lubbock. In 2002, Goodacre's work won the James Earl Fraser Sculpture Award at the Prix De West Exhibition. In 2003, she received the Texas Medal Of Arts and later that year was inducted into the National Cowgirl Museum and Hall of Fame in the Fort Worth historic district.

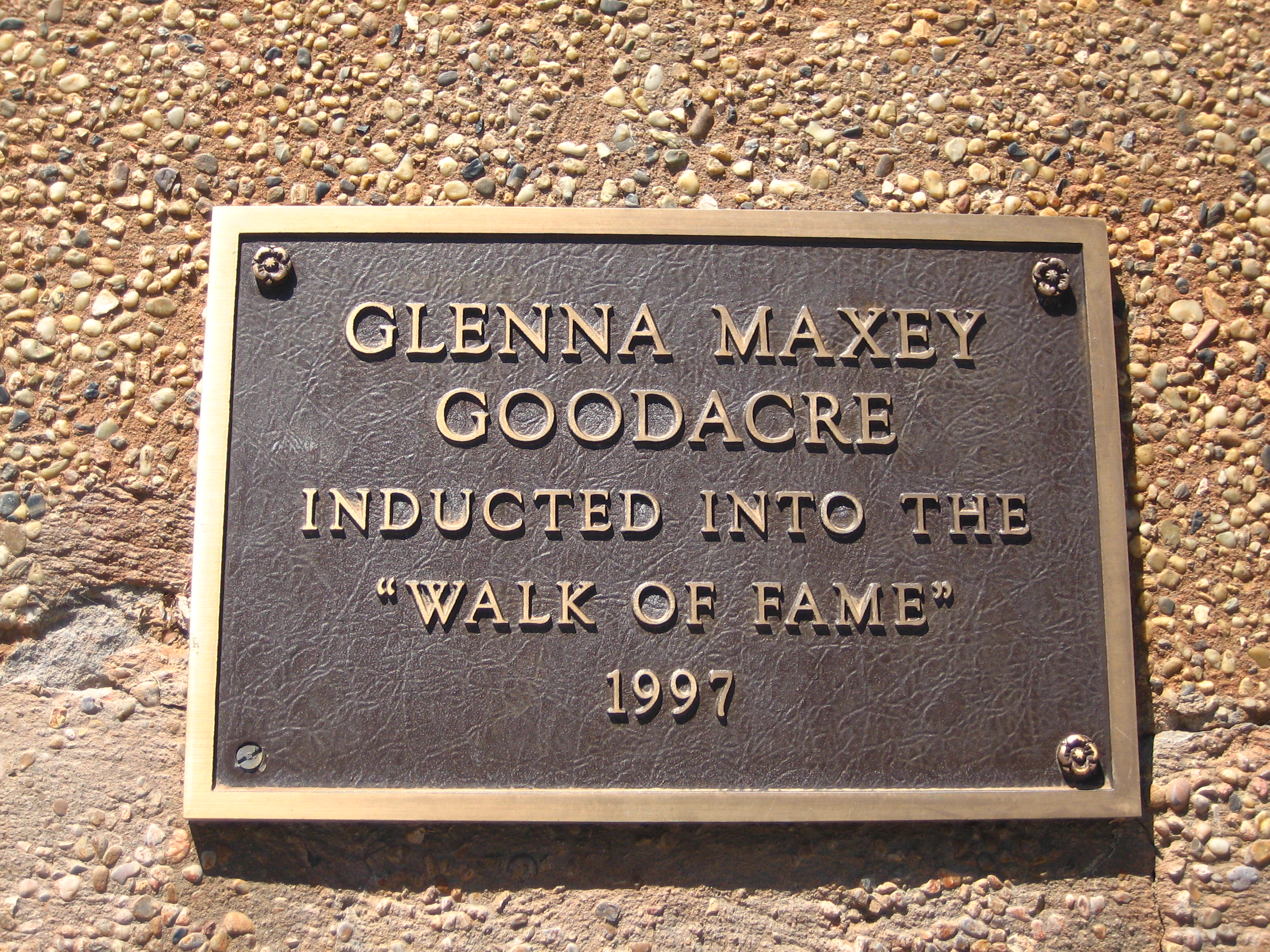
Goodacre was inducted in 1997 into the West Texas Walk of Fame in Lubbock.

In 1997, Goodacre was inducted into the West Texas Walk of Fame in Lubbock. Eleven years later, Goodacre was named the 2008 "Notable New Mexican". This honor, bestowed by the Albuquerque Museum Foundation, celebrates extraordinary living New Mexicans who contribute to the public good. A portrait of Goodacre by the artist Daniel Greene is in the permanent collection of the Albuquerque Museum in Albuquerque, New Mexico.

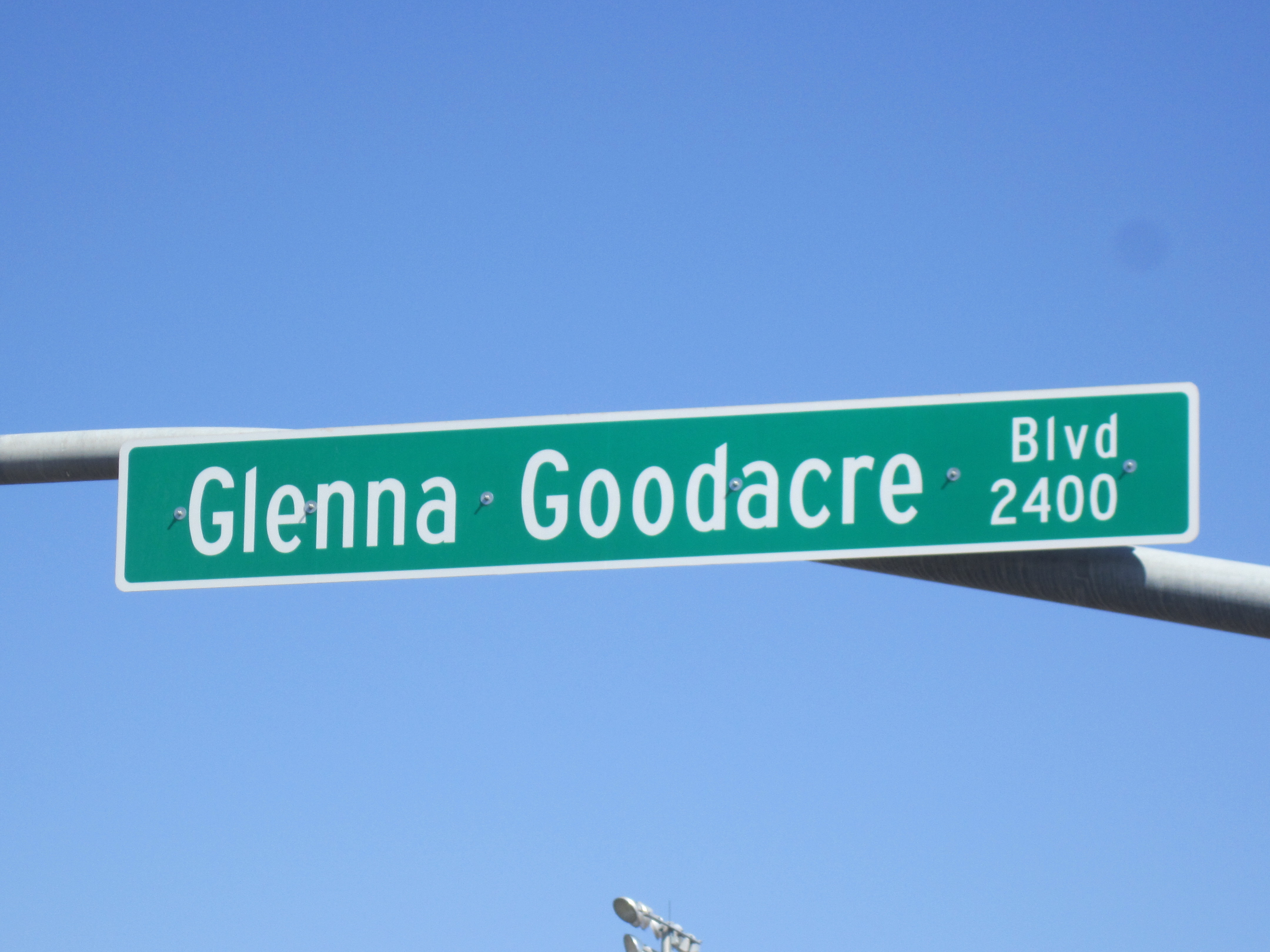
Goodacre is honored by the naming of a downtown Lubbock street which extends from the Jones AT&T Stadium at University Avenue to the east.

In 2005, the former 8th Street from University Avenue east in Lubbock was named Glenna Goodacre Boulevard; and at the State Capitol in Santa Fe, then-Governor Bill Richardson presented Goodacre with the New Mexico Governor's Award For Excellence in the Arts. In 2006, Richardson appointed Goodacre to the State Quarter Design Committee to develop a U.S. quarter coin representing New Mexico.

Goodacre retired from sculpting in 2016.

== Personal life ==
Goodacre married her first husband, William Goodacre, with whom she had two children. She married her second husband, C. L. Mike Schmidt, in 1995. On March 13, 2007, while in Santa Fe, Goodacre suffered a fall and head injury. After being taken to St. Vincent's Hospital in Santa Fe, Goodacre was transferred to the Craig Hospital brain trauma center in Englewood, Colorado. She fell into a coma and an MRI disclosed that she had suffered a massive head injury. Goodacre's husband, C.L. Mike Schmidt, told reporters, "We don't know if Glenna fainted and fell, or had a mini-stroke and fell." Schmidt reported on April 9, 2007, that his wife had made major progress in the preceding three days. In August 2007, she returned home from the hospital. On January 18, 2008, Goodacre was well enough to unveil her new sculpture "Crossing the Prairie" at the St. Vincent Regional Medical Center in Santa Fe. She was reported to have recovered very well but had lingering problems with concentration because of aphasia.

She was the mother of Tim Goodacre and 1980s model Jill Goodacre, who is married to the singer and actor Harry Connick Jr.

Glenna Goodacre died of natural causes in Santa Fe on April 13, 2020, at the age of 80.

== Selected portraiture ==
- Stephen F. Austin, Anheuser-Busch, SeaWorld, San Antonio, Texas
- Dan Blocker (Bonanza co-star), 1973, O'Donnell, Texas, across from O'Donnell Heritage Museum
- Dwight D. Eisenhower 1987, Anheuser-Busch, SeaWorld of Texas
- William Curry Holden, historian, archaeologist, and first director of the Museum of Texas Tech University in Lubbock, bust located in rotunda of Holden Hall
- Ralph A. Johnston, National Cowboy & Western Heritage Museum, Oklahoma City
- Scott Joplin, 1987, Anheuser-Busch, Sea World of Texas
- Barbara Jordan, 1987, Anheuser-Busch, Sea World of Texas
- Katherine Ann Porter, 1986, Anheuser-Busch, Sea World of Texas
- Ronald W. Reagan, After the Ride, 1998, Ronald Reagan Presidential Library and Museum, Simi Valley
- Eric Sloane, National Cowboy & Western Heritage Museum, Oklahoma City
- William Worrall Mayo, Charles Horace Mayo, William J. Mayo, "Ancestors", Mayo Clinic, Arizona

== Selected public monuments ==
- Rescue, (1999), Montgomery Museum of Fine Arts, Blount Cultural Park, Montgomery, Alabama
- The Puddle Jumpers, (1989), Montgomery Museum of Fine Arts, Blount Cultural Park, Montgomery, Alabama
- Raising the Flag or Pledge of Allegiance, (1991), Stroh's Plaza, Detroit, Michigan
- Vietnam Women's Memorial, National Mall, Washington, D.C. (1993)
- Philosopher's Rock (1994), depicting Roy Bedichek, J. Frank Dobie and Walter Prescott Webb, Zilker Park, Austin, Texas
- The Irish Memorial, (2003) Penn's Landing, Philadelphia, Pennsylvania
- Crossing the Prairie, 2002, Texas Tech University Health Sciences Center, Amarillo, Texas
