= Nữ công Học hội =

Vietnamese women's organization

Nữ công Học hội ("Women's Labor Study Group"), was a Vietnamese women's organization, founded in 1926. It was the first women's organization in Vietnam.

Since the publication of the Nữ giới chung (Women's news) by Sương Nguyệt Anh in 1919, a feminism movement dominated by the educated elite of Vietnamese upper- and middle-class new women had begun in Vietnam, and Nữ công Học hội was its first organization.

It was founded by Nguyen Khoa Tung (Đạm Phương) in Hue in 1926. Its purpose was to work for the improvement of the position of women, foremost within the area of education and professional opportunities. Under the leadership of Dam Phuong, the organization performed campaigns in favor of women's issues, particularly within education and professional's issues, which were the main issues of interest to the middle class feminists at the time. It also addressed political rights, the issue of polygamy and child marriage. The organization also had its own publication.

The organization did have an impact on the women's movement in Vietnam, and was followed by the similar Nu luu hoc hoi (Women Studies Associations) in 1929. However, while the organization did attract a lot of attention and actively participated in the public debate of the day, it achieved very little tangible success, and dissolved in 1931. The French colonial authorities did support education for women as such, since they viewed it at as a way to strengthen French control by weakening the local culture, but it did not like the influence of French feminism, which represented a revolutionary ideology in the colony. In parallel, the Confucian Vietnamese male elite and intellectuals disliked feminism because it came from France, and they expected Vietnamese women to show patriotic support against the colonial power by acting in accordance with the local (Confucian Vietnamese) culture.

During the 1930s, the failure of the Vietnamese elite feminism was succeeded by feminism in Vietnam gradually becoming more associated with the Indochinese Communist Party (ICP) and its women's branch, the Vietnamese Women's Union (VWU).

== See also ==
- Women in Vietnam
