= Vietnamese Women's Museum =

Museum in Hanoi, Vietnam

- Bảo tàng Phụ nữ Việt Nam
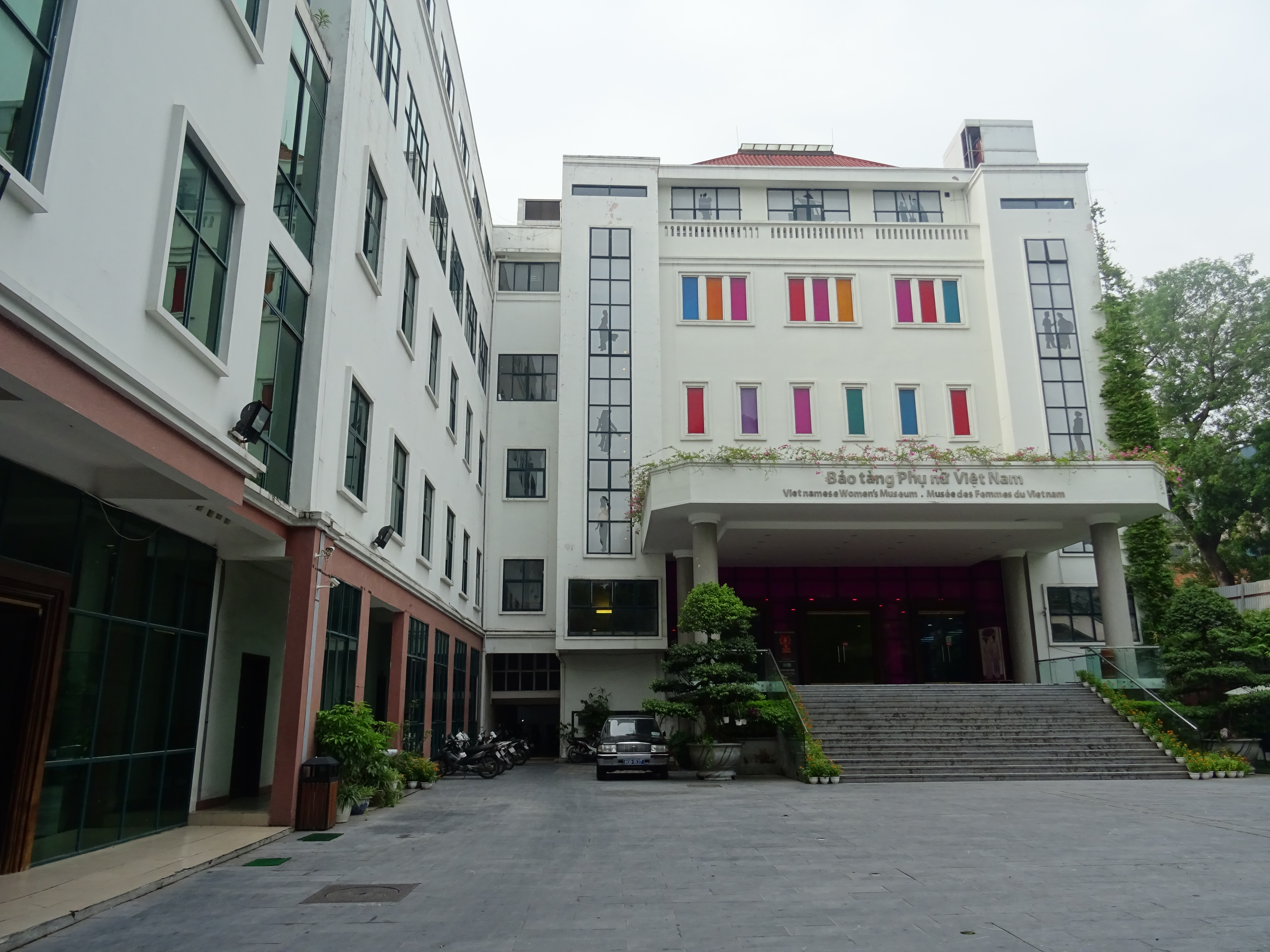
- Established: 1995
- Location: 36 Ly Thuong Kiet Str, Hoan Kiem, Hanoi
- Coordinates: 21.023463°N 105.851619°E
- Director: Nguyen Thi Bich Van
- Public transit access: Bus: 08, No 31, No 36, No 49
- Website: Official website

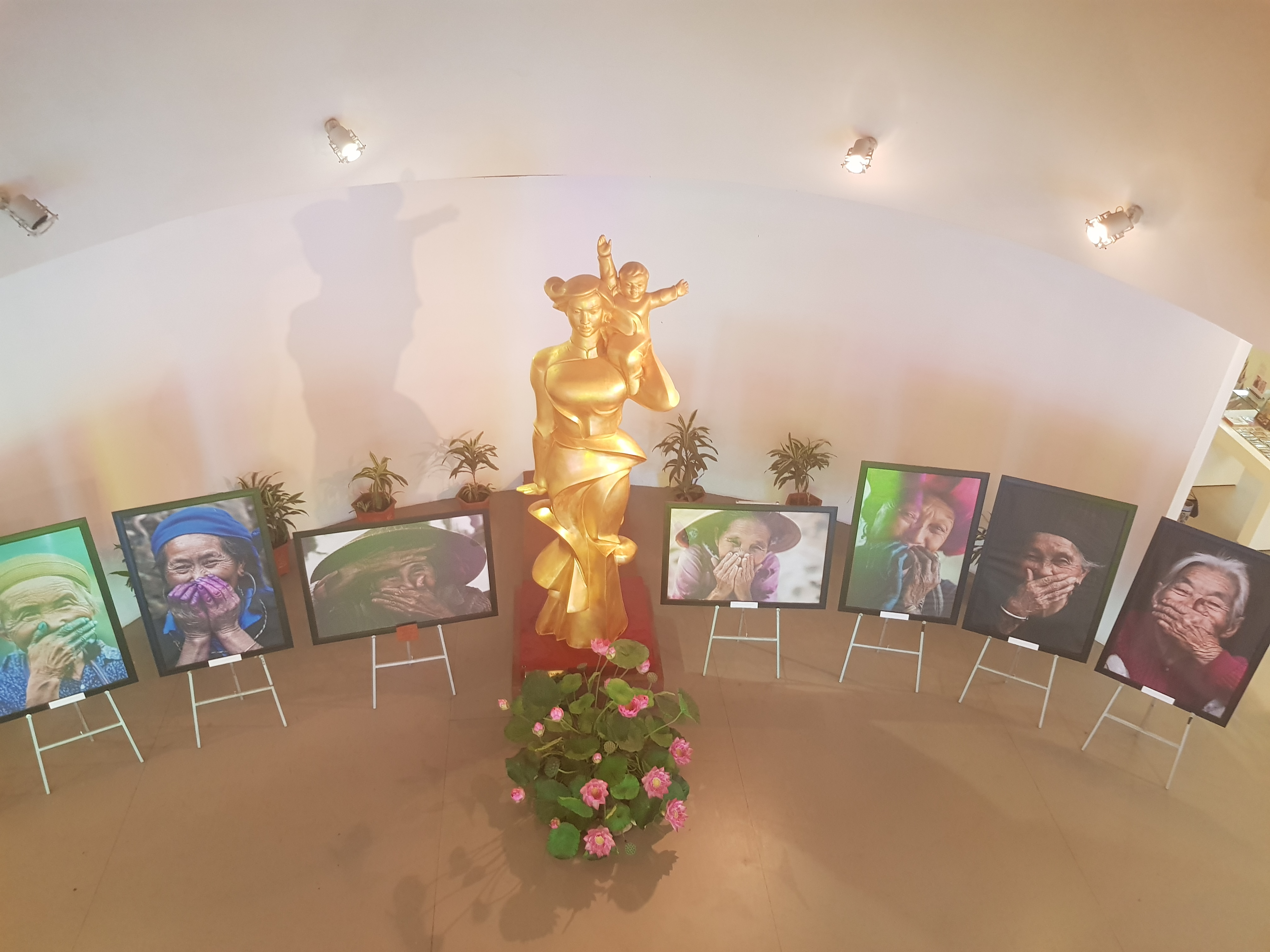
Hall of Vietnamese Women's Museum

The Vietnamese Women's Museum (Vietnamese: Bảo tàng Phụ nữ Việt Nam), is a museum established and operated by the Vietnam Women's Union, officially opened its doors to public in 1995. The four-storey building is in Hanoi, Ly Thuong Kiet Street, situated along the central Hoan Kiem Lake and old quarter.

It underwent renovation between 2006 and 2010. It functions as a gender museum and research centre that provides knowledge on the historical and cultural heritage of Vietnamese women among the nation's 54 ethnic communities. By featuring women as its central theme, it illuminates the significant roles and contributions of Vietnamese women in the historical and cultural development of Vietnam. The museum also provides a platform for intercultural exchanges to occur between women in Vietnam and global societies, with the goal of fostering “equality, development and peace.” The museum consists of three permanent exhibitions: (1) Women in Family, (2) Women in History and (3) Women's Fashion. The permanent exhibitions feature more than 1000 materials, photographs and artifacts that describe the roles of Vietnamese women in the nation's history and contemporary society (e.g., arts and domestic life)

The museum also organises thematic exhibitions to showcase transformations and new developments that occur in contemporary Vietnam. The museum's key mission is “to enhance public knowledge and understanding of history and cultural heritage of Vietnamese women…thus contributing to promoting gender equality.”

== Historical background ==
The Vietnamese Women's Museum was officially established on 10 January 1987 as per instructions by the Socialist Republic of Vietnam's government. This was part of the government's priorities to recognise the role played by women in the nation's historical and cultural development and, promote female empowerment. Plans to establish the museum were initiated in 1985 by Nguyen Thi Dinh, who was serving as the president of the Vietnam Women's Union at the time. Nguyen was also a renowned leader of the National Liberation Front during the Second Indochina War. Nguyen hoped for “the character of the museum to be different from any other museum in Vietnam [and] wanted it to be a center for research and activities especially for and about women; a place where women could feel comfortable and enjoy themselves.” Although approval for the museum's construction was granted in 1985, the construction process was delayed due to resource constraints. In 1991, construction began with financial assistance provided by the Vietnam Women's Union and Ministry of Culture. The museum was designed by architect Tran Xuan Diem. It was officially opened on 20 October 1995. The museum was closed for redevelopment and refurbishment works from 2006 to 2010 with funds provided by the Vietnamese government, Vietnam Women's Union, and the Ford Foundation. In 2010, the museum was reopened to the public with modernised architecture and facilities and a new permanent exhibition. The museum also evolved from a cultural and historical museum into a gender-focused museum. The Vietnamese Women's Museum is funded and operated by the Vietnam Women's Union and stands as an entity within the organisation. It reflects the policies and political agenda of the union.

=== Use of museum land for a cafeteria ===
From 2009 onward, 80m^{2} of land at the front of Museum, Lies Thuong Kiet street, and has been rented to a cafeteria. The contract is dated 15/7/2009 and signed by Nguyen Thi Tuyet, the museum director at that time, and Dao Boi Huong, a representative of Van Viet Company. However, after nearly two years of implementation of this joint venture agreement, the Presidium of the Central Committee of the Vietnam Women's Union issued a decision on allowing the Vietnam Women's Museum to perform service activities matching its field of expertise.

Talking to reporters, Nguyen Thi Tuyet Van, the current museum director, said, "All our activities are based on the Cultural Heritage Law and Circular 18/2010 / TT BVHTTDL of the Ministry of Culture, Sports and Tourism, which prescribed organization, functions and duties of the Museum, the revenue is guaranteed to pay full payment to the state budget in accordance with the regulations."

== Collections and exhibitions ==
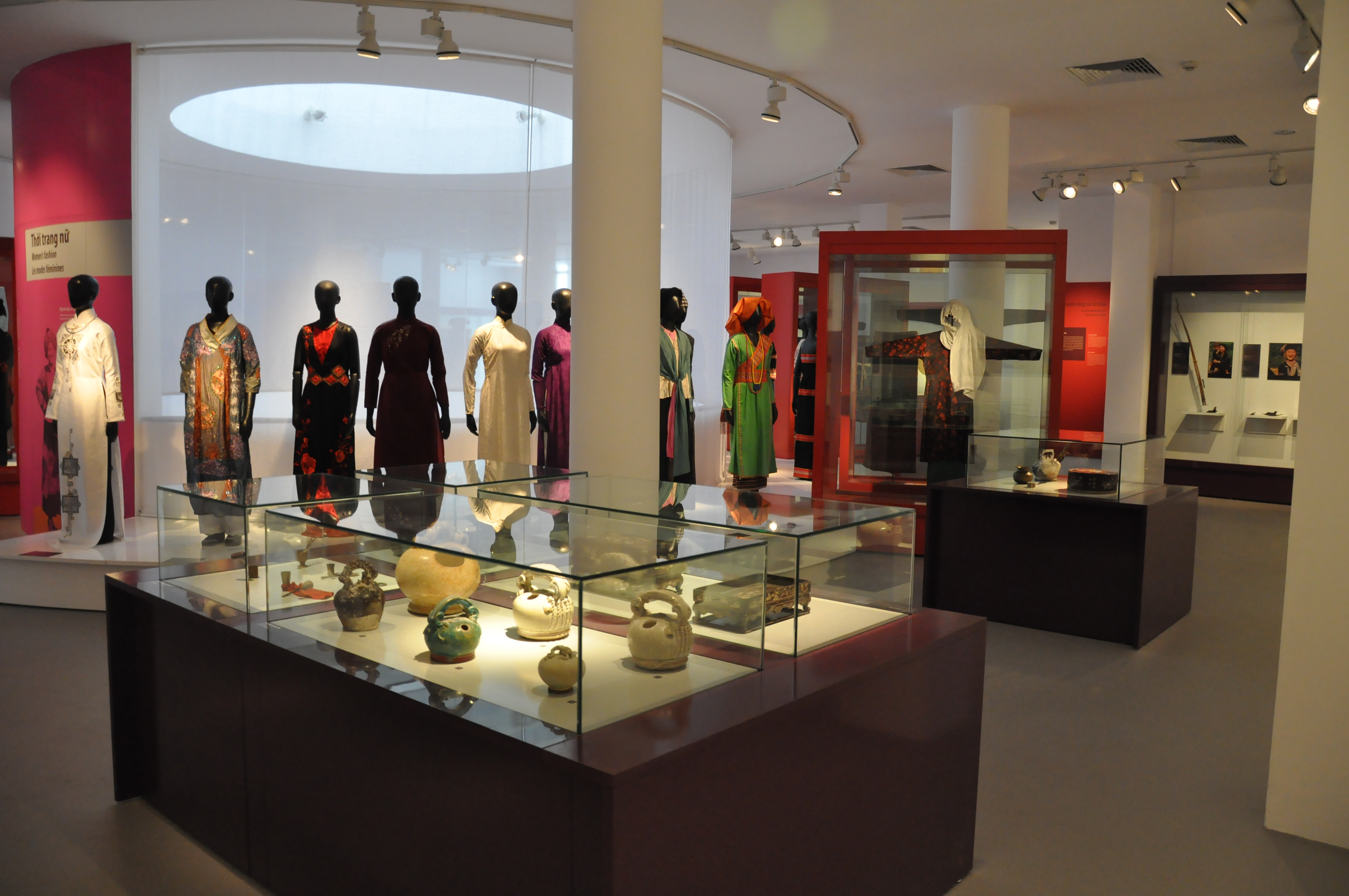
Women's Fashion section

The Vietnamese Women's Museum contains approximately 40,000 materials and artifacts, a permanent exhibition, frequent special exhibitions and an immersive audio guide illustrating the lives of Vietnamese women in the past, wartime and contemporary society. The items were gathered by the museum and Vietnam Women's Union since the 1970s. A public relations specialist, Nguyen Bich Van, was also appointed to travel across Vietnam and persuade families to provincial women's union organisations to donate clothes, photographs and other memorabilia pertaining to female figures in Vietnam. From rice pots to rifles, the collected items displayed at the museum represent the successes and tribulations and, personal lives of Vietnamese women.

=== Research and studies ===
An important goal of the Vietnamese Women's Museum is to promote awareness regarding gender issues to the Vietnamese public. Hence, the museum has been conducting studies to identify general concerns and issues related to gender (particularly gender equality) in the Vietnam. In doing so, it hoped to affirm the role and position of Vietnamese women in the society. Indeed, historical and cultural studies have highlighted the immense contributions made by Vietnamese women towards the nation's development since its early days. Through surveys, research and fieldtrips conducted across 64 provinces and cities in Vietnam, it was revealed that public awareness regarding gender and women's issues were limited, particularly in the rural and remote areas. Women living in the remote areas generally expressed disinterest in attending meetings or visiting crowded places. They were also afraid of being interviewed by the museum officials and hesitated to express their views on women's roles and position within the household. The museum officials attributed this to their fear of public speaking, low literacy rate, lack of social interaction and unequal distribution of labour for women. Indeed, the results of the surveys and research conducted by the museum officials over the years revealed that Vietnamese women had limited time for rest and relaxation or participation in community activities. Majority of their time was spent on housework and other activities such as working on fields, looking for food, raising livestock and holding secondary jobs to earn incomes. These factors have limited Vietnamese women's participation and contribution to the development of Vietnam and, hampered their development, progress and gender equality.

Furthermore, the museum also received critical feedback that its exhibitions were largely focused on issues of past history and women's revolution, with minimal emphasis on the Vietnamese women's private lives and experiences (particularly disadvantaged groups of women). Hence, the museum conducted a survey to gather public feedback to identify their views on: what makes the existing exhibits less attractive, what the exhibitions can include more of and how the museum can contribute towards society and advocating gender equality. Information gathered from research and studies have enabled the museum to develop relevant exhibitions, programmes and activities to cater to the needs of the society.

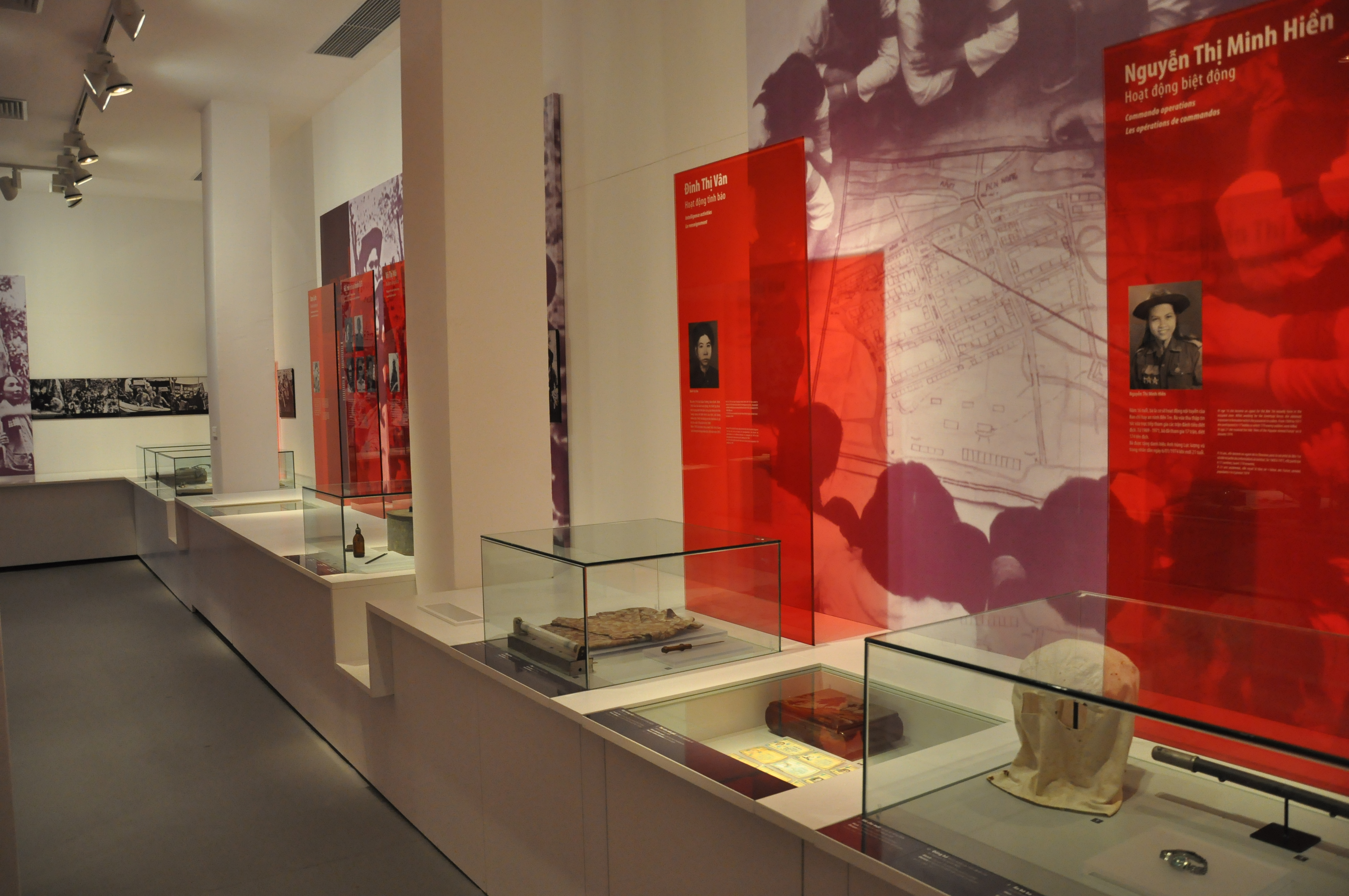
Women in History section

=== Permanent exhibitions ===
The museum consists of three permanent exhibitions: (1) Women in Family, (2) Women in History and (3) Women's Fashion, located on the second, third and top storeys of the building respectively.

==== Women in Family ====
This exhibition covers the “circle of life” faced by Vietnamese women throughout the course of their lives from youth to marriage and motherhood. It presents their varied roles and positions within the society as well as significant events, rituals and practices related to: wedding, childbirth, maternity and child care, business, cultivation, fishing and foraging, cooking, pottery, and tailoring.

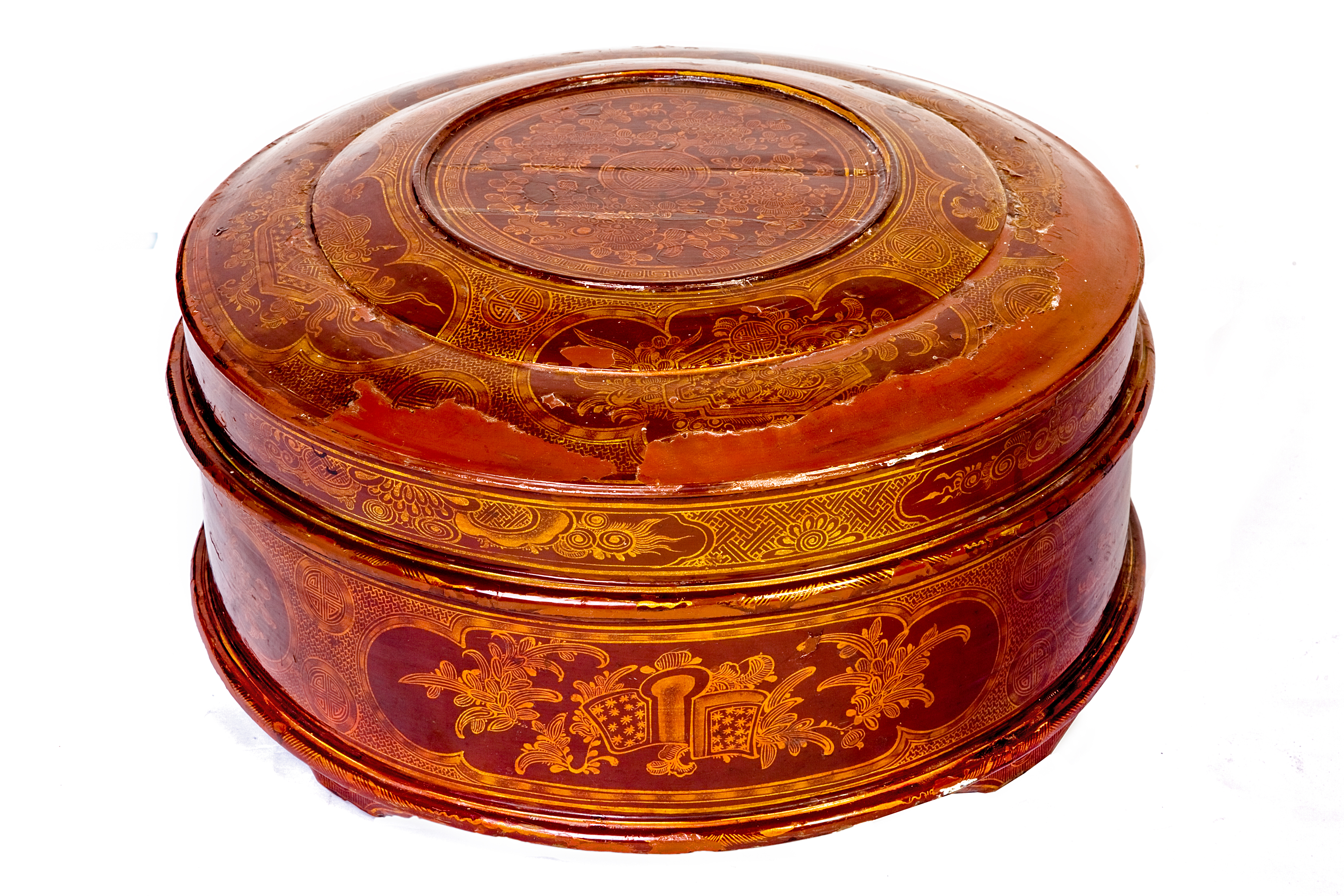
Gift Box

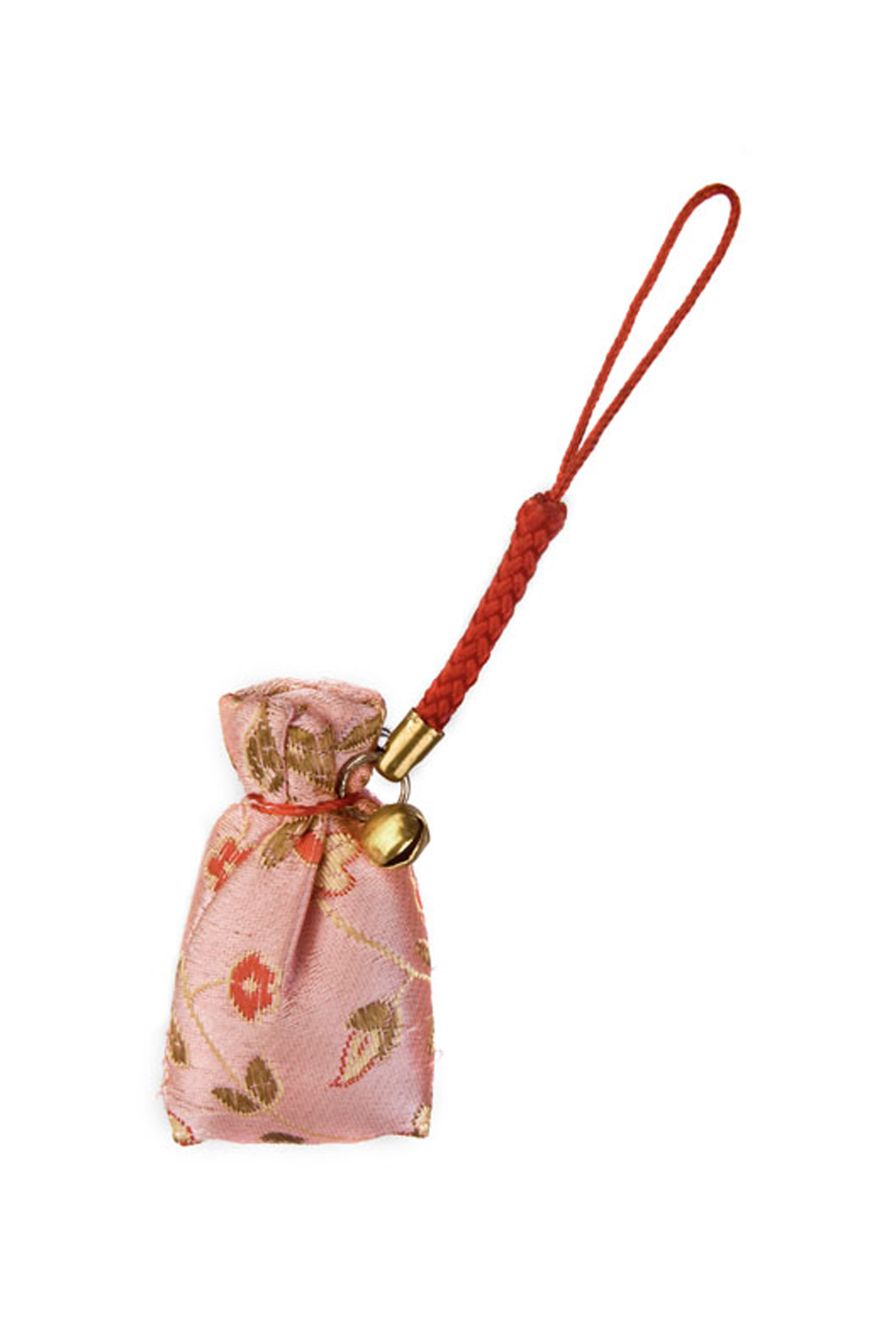
Việt Amulet

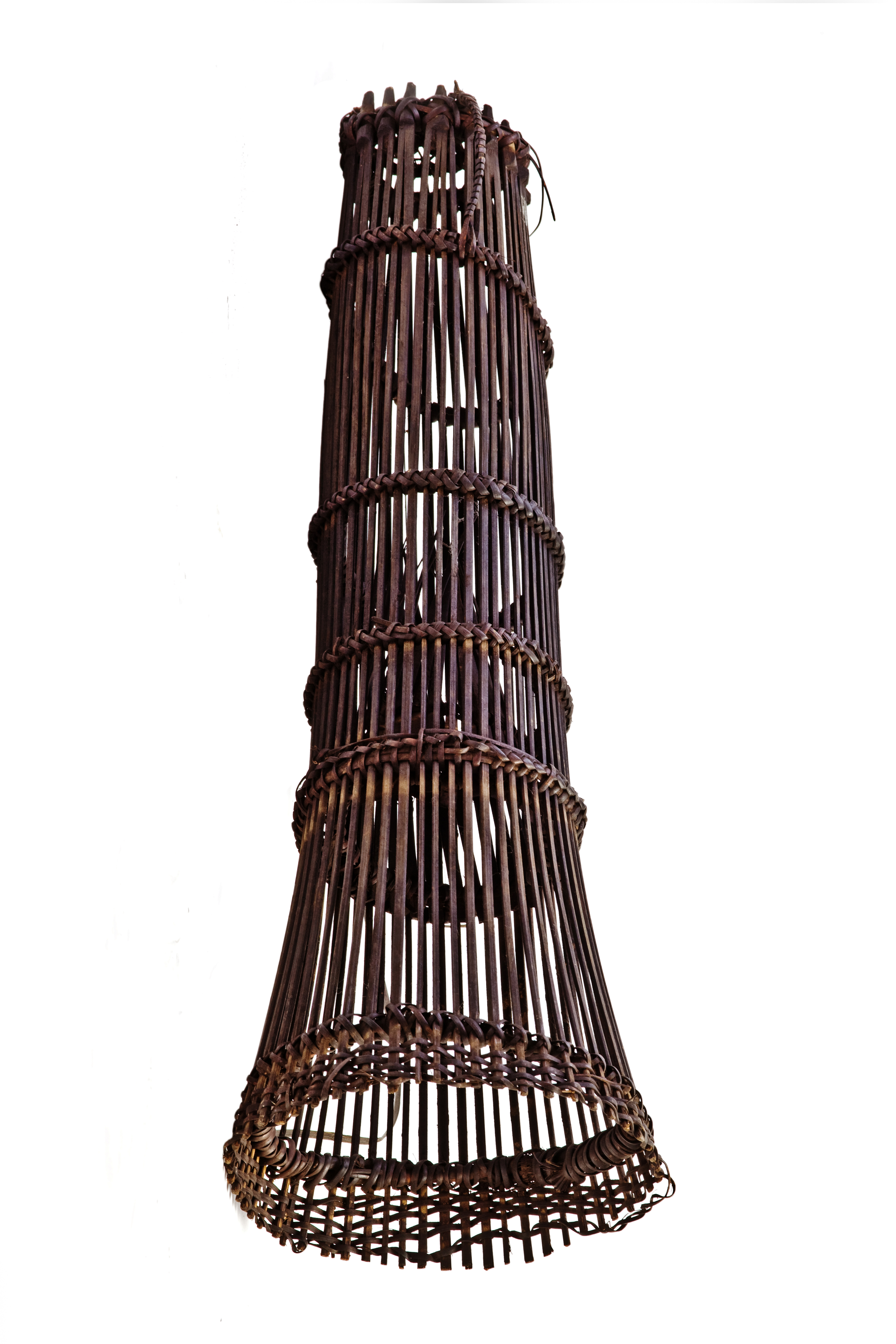
Hrê Passive hoop net

==== Women in History ====
This exhibition mainly covers the roles and participation of women during wartime resistance against enemies. It also showcases the experiences and diverse aspects of women's everyday lives in Vietnam during wartime. Stories of these women's wartime contributions, struggles, sacrifices, and glorious feats with weapons are vividly demonstrated by the artifacts and objects displayed within the exhibits. There are also short films that describe Vietnamese women's personalities, passion, skills, spirit, and traditional values in the contemporary society.

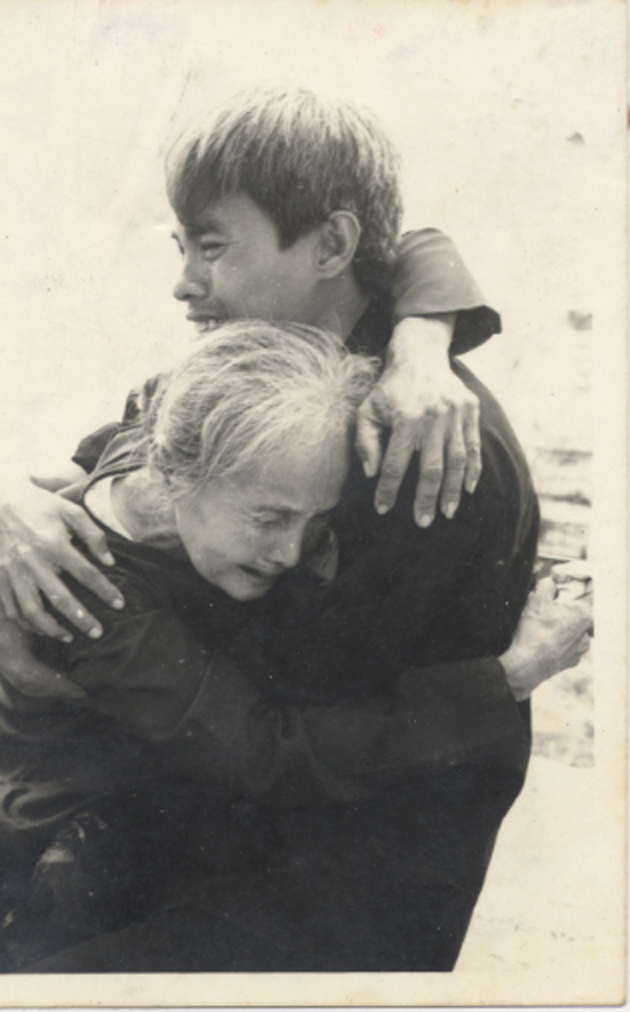
Le Van Thuc meeting his mother

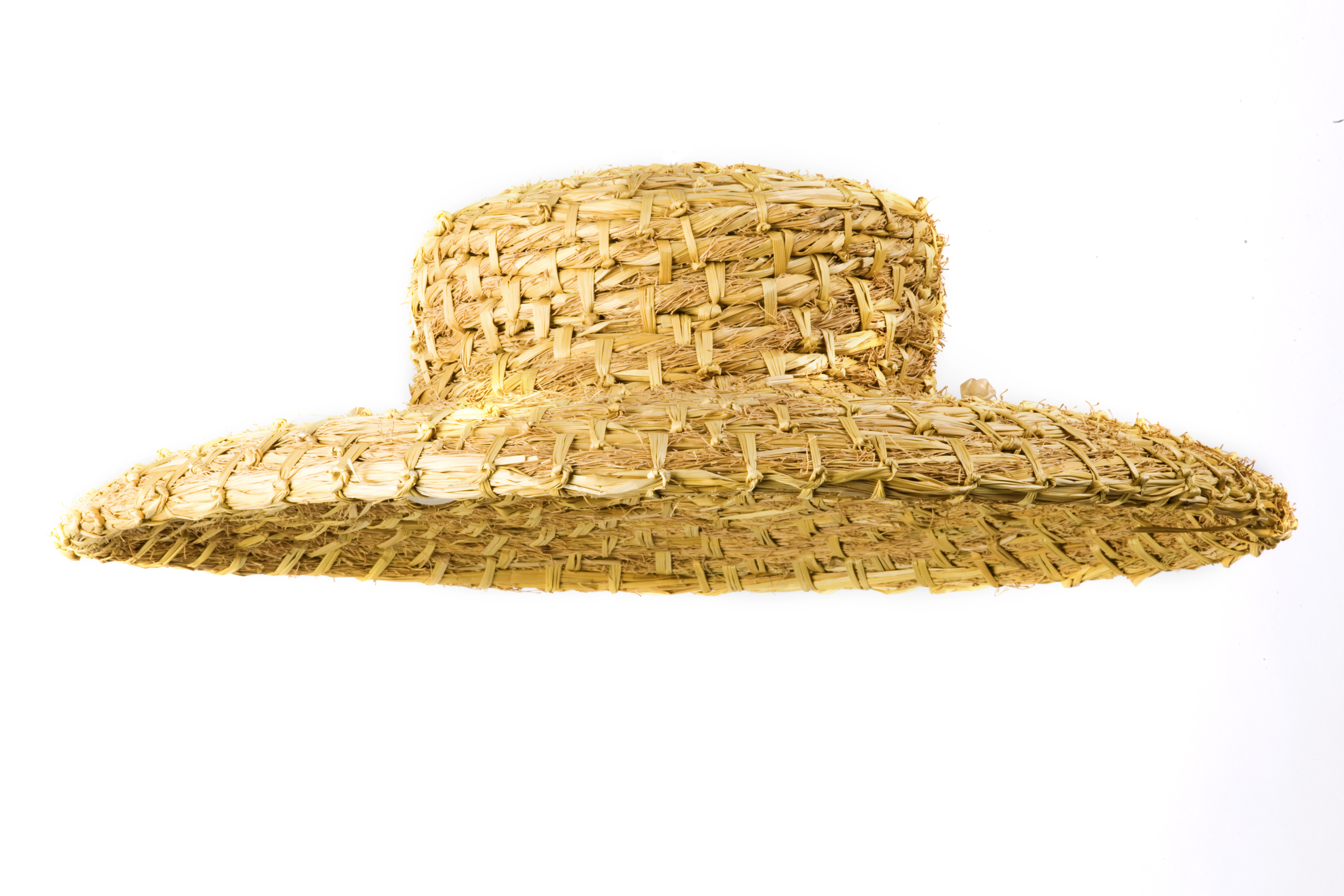
Straw hat

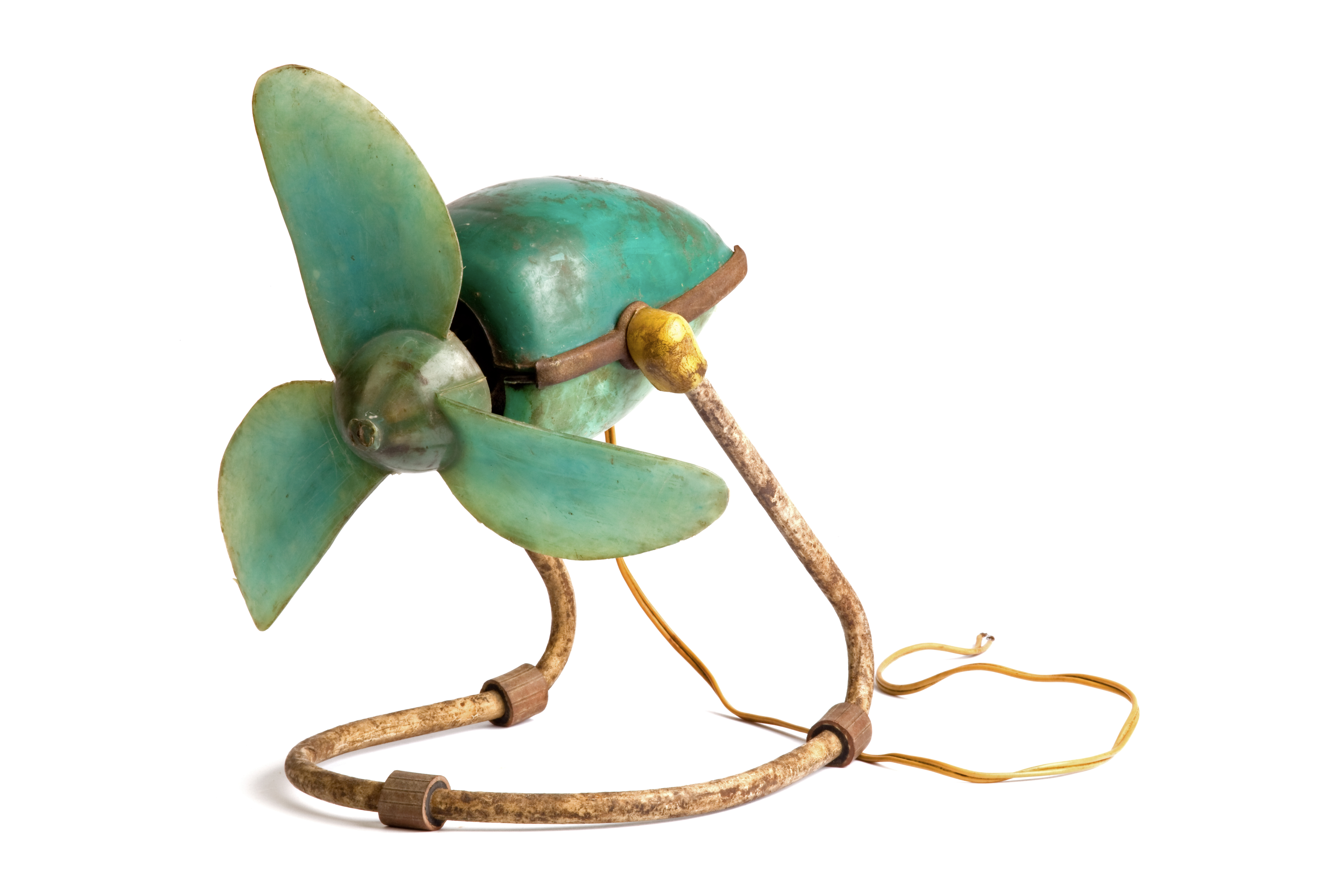
"Toad" Fan of Pham Thi Thai

==== Women’s Fashion ====
This exhibition covers the aspects of beauty and fashion and, expressions of femininity in Vietnam. It showcases the clothing styles, costumes, and accessories according to the distinct traditions of the 54 ethnic communities in Vietnam.

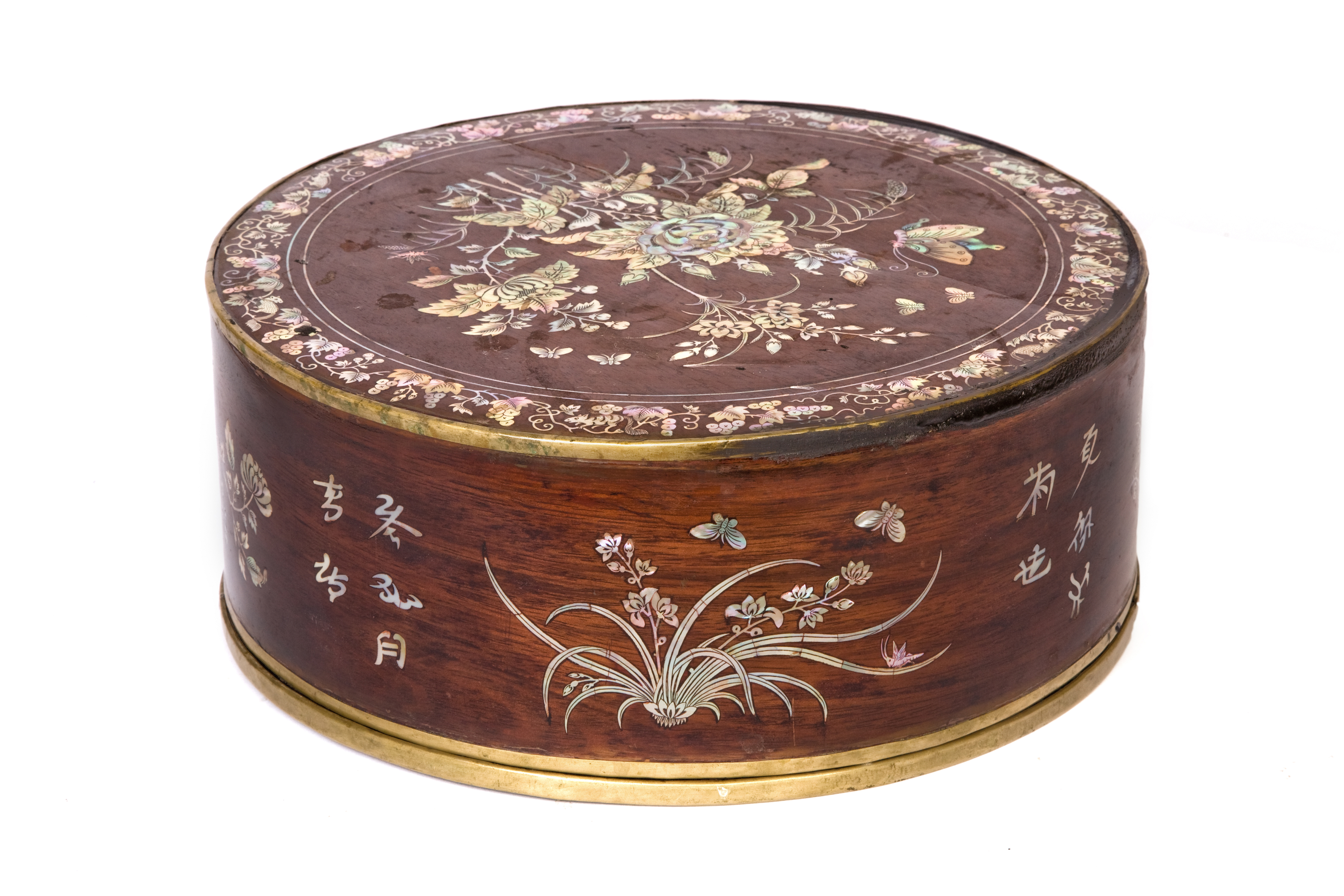
Betel Pot

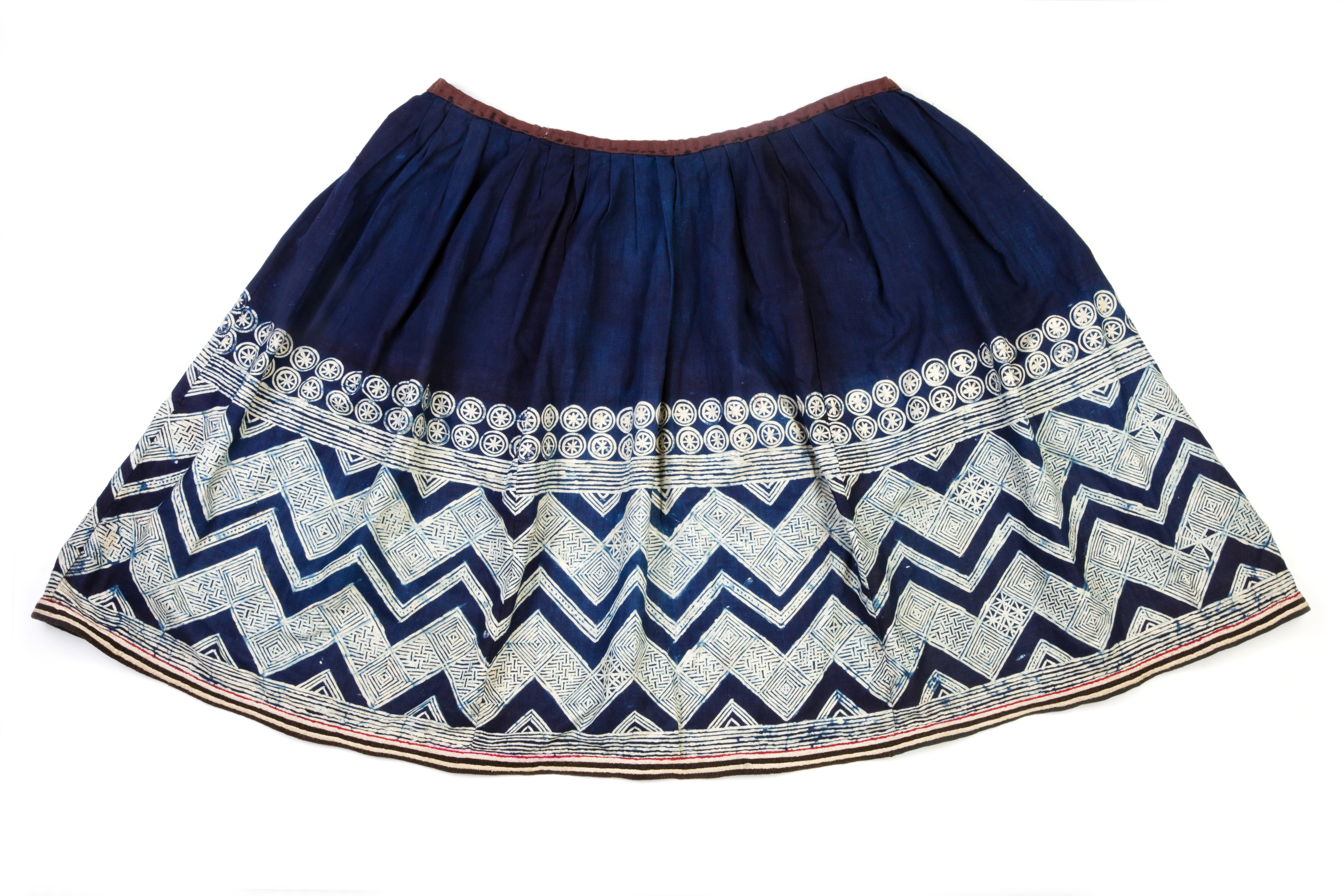
Yao Tien Hemp

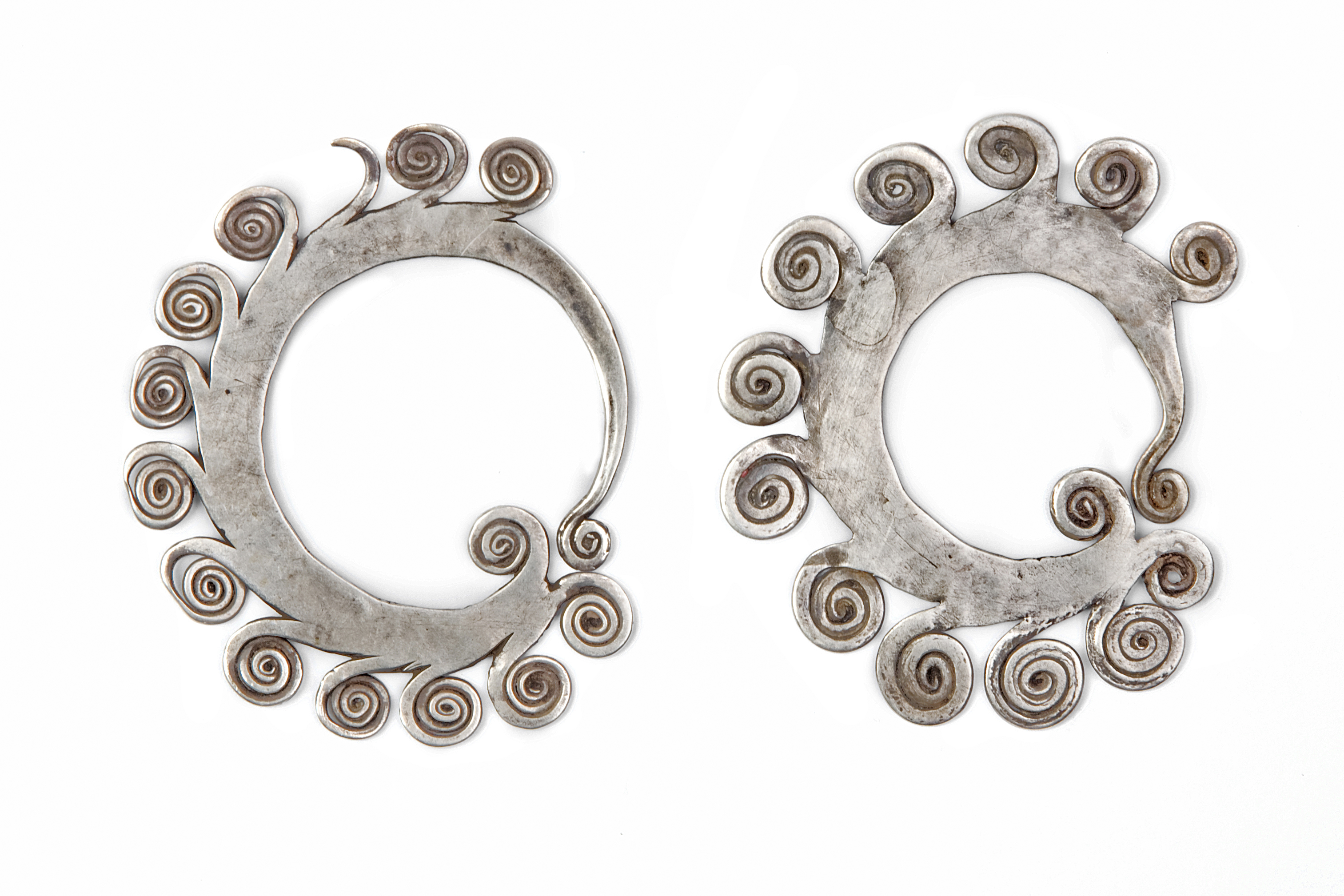
Hmong Silver earrings

=== Special exhibitions ===
Aside from its permanent exhibition, the Vietnamese Women's Museum has also organised many special exhibitions focusing on different subjects. The exhibitions include the following:

(1) Family Life and Social Activities of Women in Cua Van Fishing Village (2004)

In 2004, the museum held its first special exhibition titled that featured the personal stories and lives of women living in the village.

(2) Who is going to care? (2006)

This exhibition promoted awareness regarding HIV/AIDS and educated public on assisting and integrating HIV/AIDS patients into the community.

(3) Women overcoming bad fates (2007)

This exhibition featured inspiring stories of Vietnamese women who displayed sheer strength and determination to successfully overcome adversities and establish their lives.

(4) Street Vendors (2008)

This exhibition featured the emotional stories of the lives and sacrifices of street vendors in Hanoi.

(5) Changing for alteration

This exhibition was jointly developed with the Center of Women's Development and held on World Violence Prevention Day (25 November 2009). It featured the stories of victims of domestic violence.

(6) Peaceful Place (2010)

This exhibition promoted awareness regarding the trafficking of women and children in Vietnam. It featured stories of victims residing at a “peaceful house” that provided shelter for them.

(7) Single Mothers’ Voices (2011)

This exhibition portrays the stories of 18 single mothers from the Tan Minh commune, Soc Son district in Hanoi. It featured their everyday struggles and discrimination and prejudice inflicted upon them in society.

(8) Áo dài exhibition (2019)

This exhibition featured the áo dài.

=== Traveling exhibitions ===
The Vietnamese Women's Museum has also been on the move and set up traveling exhibitions across several remote and mountainous zones in Vietnam. This was meant to cater to the needs of Vietnamese women living in such areas who may find it inconvenient to visit the museum directly. The exhibits displayed items of historical and cultural significance, aiming to promote awareness amongst a wider stratum of the nation's populace. Members of the public, particularly women, also directly assisted the museum in providing facts, responding to interviews and donating appropriate items for display.

=== Virtual exhibitions ===
The Vietnamese Women's Museum has also set up many virtual exhibitions (such as Street Vendors) on its official website for overseas researchers and international audience to learn about gender issues in Vietnam.

== Activities and programmes ==
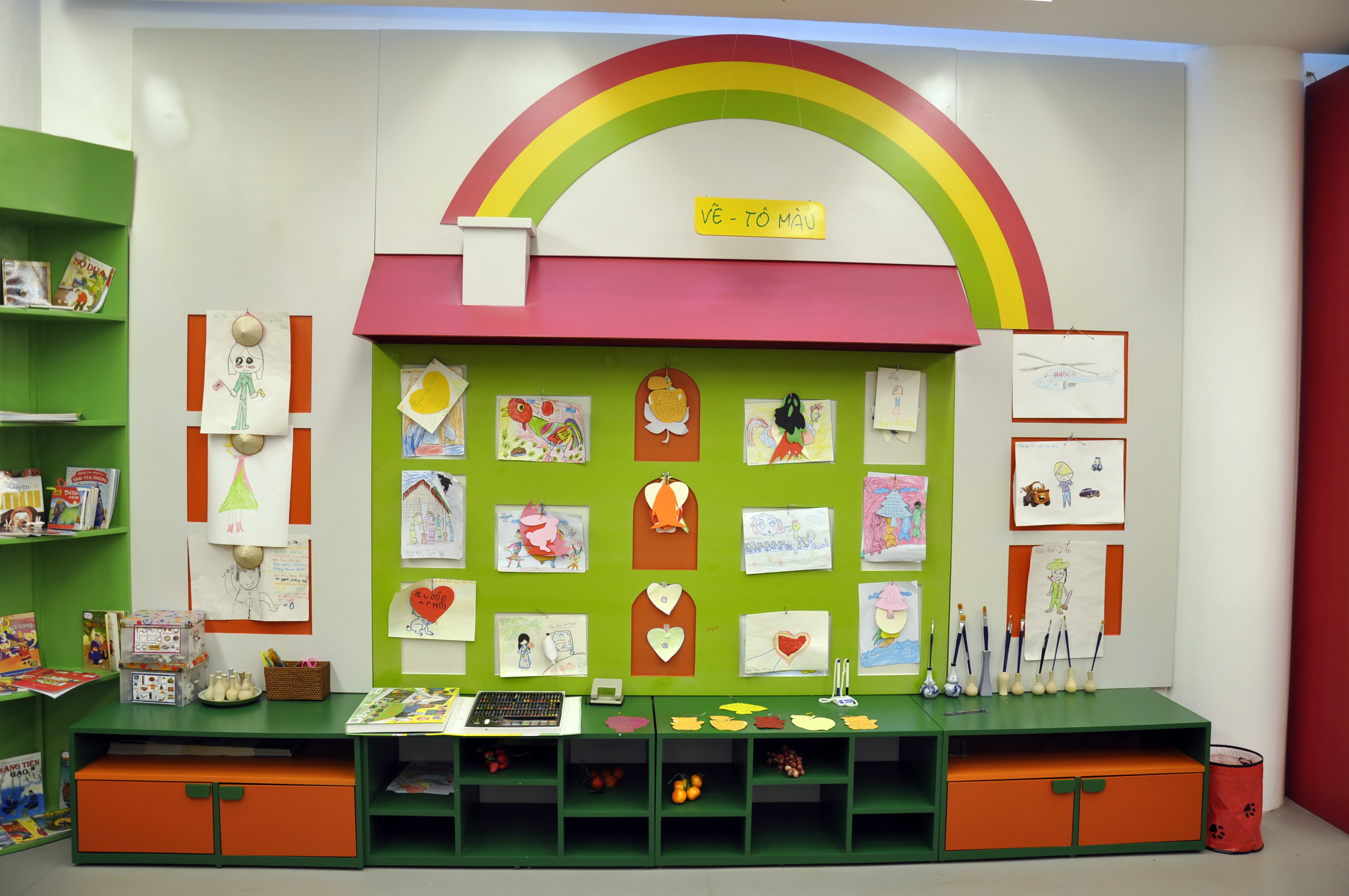
Discovery room

The Vietnamese Women's Museum has organised many workshops regarding gender and gender equality, such as ‘Activities of the Vietnam Women’s Union’, ‘Women and Family’, and ‘Women, Museum and Sustainable Development.’ It also organised several activities that were specifically targeted at students, such as cultural exchanges, meetings with historical witnesses, ethnic weaving and embellishment as well as writing and drawing competitions. Such activities have promoted awareness regarding gender issues amongst the younger generation and provided them with opportunities to discover their skills and talents.

The museum also provided opportunities for artisans to showcase and sell their embellished and textile products in the museum shop and exhibits. This has helped women from rural provinces to generate revenue for their families.

The museum has also collaborated with external organisations to organise regular roundtable talks to collect further materials for display and share information on the roles and contributions of Vietnamese women through the distribution of publications and leaflets. It also organised a writing competition titled ‘Women overcoming destiny’ to honour Vietnamese women's contributions and sacrifices to the nation's defence sector. Aside from promoting awareness, the museum has also encouraged Vietnamese women to actively participate in their activities.

== Productions and publications ==
The Vietnamese Women's Museum has compiled, printed and published books and leaflets such as the President Ho Chi Minh with the Cause of Women's Emancipation (1990 and 2001), Female Soldier of Coconut Corest (1992), female Images in Han & Nom Languages (1996) and We Learn about Cleaners’ Work (May 2007). The museum has also produced documentary films such as Return to the Original Point (1990), The Beauty of Clothes of Vietnamese Ethnic Women (1995) and Folk Games and Children's Songs (2005) that reflect Vietnamese women's contributions to Vietnamese history and culture. Pain Remained features the stories of ‘Agent Orange’ victims during the Vietnam War while Motherhood and A Day of Women in a Cua Van Fishing Village (2004) reflects the tough lives of Vietnamese women in a fishing village in Ha Long Bay. Mother's Great Happiness and River of Light (2007) reflect the hardship and struggles faced by widows and disabled women whilst raising their children. The museum has also collaborated with various media agencies such as newspapers, magazines, television and radio. In doing so, it developed a live programme titled ‘Memories as Time.’

== Challenges and limitations ==
Despite its success, the Vietnamese Women's Museum has encountered a couple of challenges and limitations in the curation and organisation of its exhibitions and programmes. They include:

(1) Marginalised communities and sensitive issues

The museum has increasingly focused on addressing marginalised communities and sensitive issues in Vietnam. It can be a difficult process for curators to approach marginalised groups of women and extract information from them. Hence, it requires much patience and effort for them to build bonds and earn their trust. The museum also had to develop networks and partnerships with various local and international social organisations to jointly tackle sensitive issues and promote public awareness regarding the discrimination faced by marginalised communities.

(2) Resource constraints

Due to limitations in financial and human resources, the museum finds its programmes effective but short-lived and unsustainable. There is also a lack of experienced research specialists.

== Co-operation ==
The museum regularly cooperates with several institutions and associations to organise special events or exhibitions:

- Center for Women and Development
- Ministry of Labour, Invalids and Social Affairs
- Embassy of Finland, Hanoi
- Ford Foundation
- Institute for Development and Community Health (Light)
- Hanoi International Women's Club
- Singapore Philatelic Museum
- Japan Foundation
- Fresh Studio
- Healthbridge

== Visitorship ==
Statistics have shown that the Vietnamese Women's Museum has been primarily visited by foreigners. Generally, the museum seemed to witness increased visits during national holidays and significant occasions such as International Women's Day and Vietnamese Women's Day. The museum has worked closely with local organisations and tour agencies to boost visitorship over the years.

== Awards and recognition ==
The Vietnamese Women's Museum has been listed as one of the best attractions in Hanoi by tourism website TripAdvisor many times. The statue of a “Vietnamese mother” at the museum lobby won the first prize at a sculpture competition organised by the Museum and the Fine Arts Association of Ho Chi Minh City in 1995.

== Services and utilities ==
The Vietnamese Women's Museum contains the following services and utilities within its premises:

(1) Audio guide in the English, French, Japanese, Korean and Vietnamese languages.

(2) Leaflets in the English, French, Japanese, Korean, Spanish, and Vietnamese languages.

(3) Wi-Fi access

(4) Free lockers

(5) Restrooms and wheelchairs for people with disabilities

(6) Museum shop

(7) Museum cafeteria

Since 2009, 80m^{2} of land at the front of the museum was rented to a cafeteria. The contract, dated 15 July 2009, was signed by Nguyen Thi Tuyet (the then director of the museum) and Dao Boi Huong (representative of Van Viet Company).

== See also ==
- Women in Vietnam
- Museums in Hanoi
- Tourist attractions in Hanoi
