= Women in Vietnam =

General statistics
- Maternal mortality (per 100,000): 59 (2010)
- Women in parliament: 24.4% (2012)
- Women over 25 with secondary education: 24.7% (2010)
- Women in labour force: 73.2% (2011)

Gender Inequality Index
- Value: 0.296 (2021)
- Rank: 71st out of 191

Global Gender Gap Index
- Value: 0.705 (2022)
- Rank: 83rd out of 146

The role of women in Vietnam was subject to changes throughout the history of Vietnam. They have taken on varying roles in society, and the country has seen a number of advances in women's rights, such as an increase in female representation in government, and the creation of the Vietnam Women's Union in 1930.

The role of women in warfare and outside the home continued to increase throughout the 20th century, especially during the Indochina Wars. During and after the Vietnam War, the ruling Communist Party of Vietnam made efforts to increase women's rights, equity, and representation in government. This included the creation of job quotas during the 1960s, which required that women occupy a certain percentage of jobs in different sectors. Women's rights have continued to increase later, and women have increasingly held leadership positions. Vietnam has one of the highest female labour-force participation rates in the world and ranked the second most women in senior management among Asian countries.

As of 2025, two women have served as President of Vietnam (on an interim basis): Võ Thị Ánh Xuân (2023) and Đặng Thị Ngọc Thịnh (2018), with the seat of Vice President of Vietnam has been assigned to a woman as an uncodified tradition since 1992. Additionally, Nguyễn Thị Kim Ngân was elected as Chairwoman of the National Assembly of Vietnam in 2016 while Trương Thị Mai became the first female Executive Secretary of the Communist Party in 2023.

== Dynasties ==
=== Before and during Chinese rule ===
According to William S. Turley, "the role of women in traditional Vietnamese culture was determined [partly] by ... indigenous customs bearing traces of matriarchy", affecting "different social classes" to "varying degrees". According to Chiricosta, the legend of Âu Cơ is said to be evidence of "the presence of an original 'matriarchy' in North Vietnam and [it] led to the double kinship system, which developed there ... [and which] combined matrilineal and patrilineal patterns of family structure and assigned equal importance to both lines." (Note: North Vietnam, sovereign state until merged with South Vietnam in 1976) (Note: Patrilineal, belonging to the father's lineage, generally for inheritance)

In 111 BC, Chinese armies conquered the kingdom of Nanyue and tried to integrate it into the Han Empire. During this time, Confucianism was the official ideology, the Chinese language was primarily spoken, and the Chinese occupation had influence on literature and art creations. There was resistance to the Chinese rule. According to Peter C. Phan, that "the first three persons leading insurrections against China were women ... suggest[s] ... that ancient Vietnam was a matriarchal society" and "the ancient Vietnamese family system was most likely matriarchal, with women ruling over the clan or tribe" until the Vietnamese "adopt[ed] ... the patriarchal system introduced by the Chinese", although "this patriarchal system ... was not able to dislodge the Vietnamese women from their relatively high position in the family and society, especially among the peasants and the lower classes", with modern "culture and legal codes ... [promoting more] rights and privileges" for women than in Chinese culture.

Chiricosta said that other scholars relied on "this 'matriarchal' aspect of the myth to differentiate Vietnamese society from the pervasive spread of Chinese Confucian patriarchy" (Note: Confucianism, ethics and philosophy derived from Confucius) and that "resistance to China's colonization of Vietnam ... [combined with] the view that Vietnam was originally a matriarchy ... [led to viewing] women's struggles for liberation from (Chinese) patriarchy as a metaphor for the entire nation's struggle for Vietnamese independence." According to Karen G. Turner, in the 3rd century AD, Lady Triệu "seem[ed] ... to personify the matriarchal culture that mitigated Confucianized patriarchal norms .... [although] she is also painted as something of a freak ... with her ... savage, violent streak." A female military leader who managed, for a time, to successfully resist the Chinese state of Eastern Wu during its occupation of Vietnam, she is quoted as saying, "I'd like to ride storms, kill sharks in the open sea, drive out the aggressors, reconquer the country, undo the ties of serfdom, and never bend my back to be the concubine of whatever man."

When the enemy is at the gate, the woman goes out fighting. has been recited as evidence of women's stature. (Giặc đến nhà đàn bà phải đánh) - an old Vietnamese adage. The quote is "giặc đến nhà, đàn bà cũng đánh" in Vietnamese and the quote actually means that fighting in war is inappropriate for women and its only when the situation is so desperate that the war has spread to their home then women should enter the war.

=== Trưng sisters ===
In 40 AD, the Trưng Sisters Trưng Trắc and Trưng Nhị led a rebellion to get rid of Tô Định, the Chinese governor occupying Vietnam. They were daughters of a Lạc lord in Giao Chỉ (later is Northern Vietnam) and widows of aristocrats. They successfully formed their own kingdom in Mê Linh, where Trưng Trắc was proclaimed queen, and a capital was built for her". While ruling in Mê Linh, the sisters abolished taxes, which had been especially cruel under Tô Định. They were defeated in 43 AD by Ma Yuan, a Chinese general, and are regarded as female military heroes and national heroines.

According to Donald M. Seekins, an indication of "the strength of matriarchal values" was that a woman, Trưng Trắc, with her younger sister Trưng Nhị, raised an army of "over 80,000 soldiers .... [in which] many of her officers were women", with which they defeated the Chinese. According to Keith Weller Taylor, "the matriarchal flavor of the time is ... attested by the fact that Trưng Trắc's mother's tomb and spirit temple have survived, although nothing remains of her father", and the "society of the Trung sisters" was "strongly matrilineal". On the other hand, even though the Trưng sisters are remembered for their military skills and bravery, they have also been used to confirm women's societal role in a different manner. Some historians have focused on their physical beauty and emphasized their devotion to family as well as Trưng Trắc's romantic relationship with her husband, Lạc lord Thi Sach. As an iconic symbol of Vietnamese patriotism, they were used to show how weak Vietnamese men are even in comparison to Vietnamese women, as the Vietnamese men under Tô Định "bowed their heads, folded their arms, and served the northerners; how shameful is this in comparison with the two Trung sisters, who were women!"

After Ma Yuan's defeat of the Trưng sisters, the Chinese maintained domination over Vietnam for more than a thousand years. They established a bureaucracy that emphasized Confucianism, and they focused on educating Vietnam's ruling class with Chinese literature and ideas. Chinese rule ended in 939 AD when the Vietnamese army, under the direction of Ngô Quyền, defeated the Chinese army, which was already troubled by chaos within China. The Lý dynasty was established in 1010, and ruled until 1225. The Ly dynasty continued some of the political, social, and economic institutions that were imposed by the country's former Chinese rulers. For example, only males of the noble class could attend school and become members of the civil service. The Vietnamese continued to fight against Chinese influence, and in 1407 the country was once again under Chinese Rule. They re-won independence in 1428, when the Vietnamese Lê dynasty was created.

=== Champa ===
Champa king Po Rome was Cru and had a Malay wife, a Vietnamese wife, a Rade wife and Cham Awal wife. His Vietnamese wife was Nguyễn Thị Ngọc Khoa (阮福玉誇), daughter of Nguyễn Lord Nguyễn Phúc Nguyên. He was so into his sexual relations with her that he had Champa's sacred Kraik tree chopped down to cure her of illness. This enabled the Vietnamese to defeat the Cham, leading to his suicide after the Vietnamese held him in a metal cage when the Vietnamese army defeated the Chams due to the destruction of the Kraik tree leading Champa's power to be sapped.

The Cambodian King Chey Chettha II married the Vietnamese Nguyễn lord Princess Nguyễn Thị Ngọc Vạn, a daughter of Lord Nguyễn Phúc Nguyên, in 1618. In return, the king granted the Vietnamese the right to establish settlements in Mô Xoài (later is Bà Rịa), in the region of Prey Nokor—which they colloquially referred to as Sài Gòn, and which later became Ho Chi Minh City.

=== Lê and Nguyễn dynasties ===
From the 1400s onward, the ruling Lê and its successor Nguyễn dynasties further imposed the Confucian family model on Vietnamese society. Women's rights were restricted and were relegated to just as properties, subservient to the male husbands, female historical figures were minimized or rebuked. There were some examples of successful women winning through social class mobility during this period because the Confucianism and collectivism in Vietnam were not that strict and rigid as compared with other countries such as China and Japan.

Cong Huyen Ton Nu Nha Trang, a later Vietnamese researcher based in Berkeley, precised in her 1973 doctoral thesis that "how Confucian morality and a parallel Vietnamese moral order trapped women under the yoke of oppression."

== French rule ==
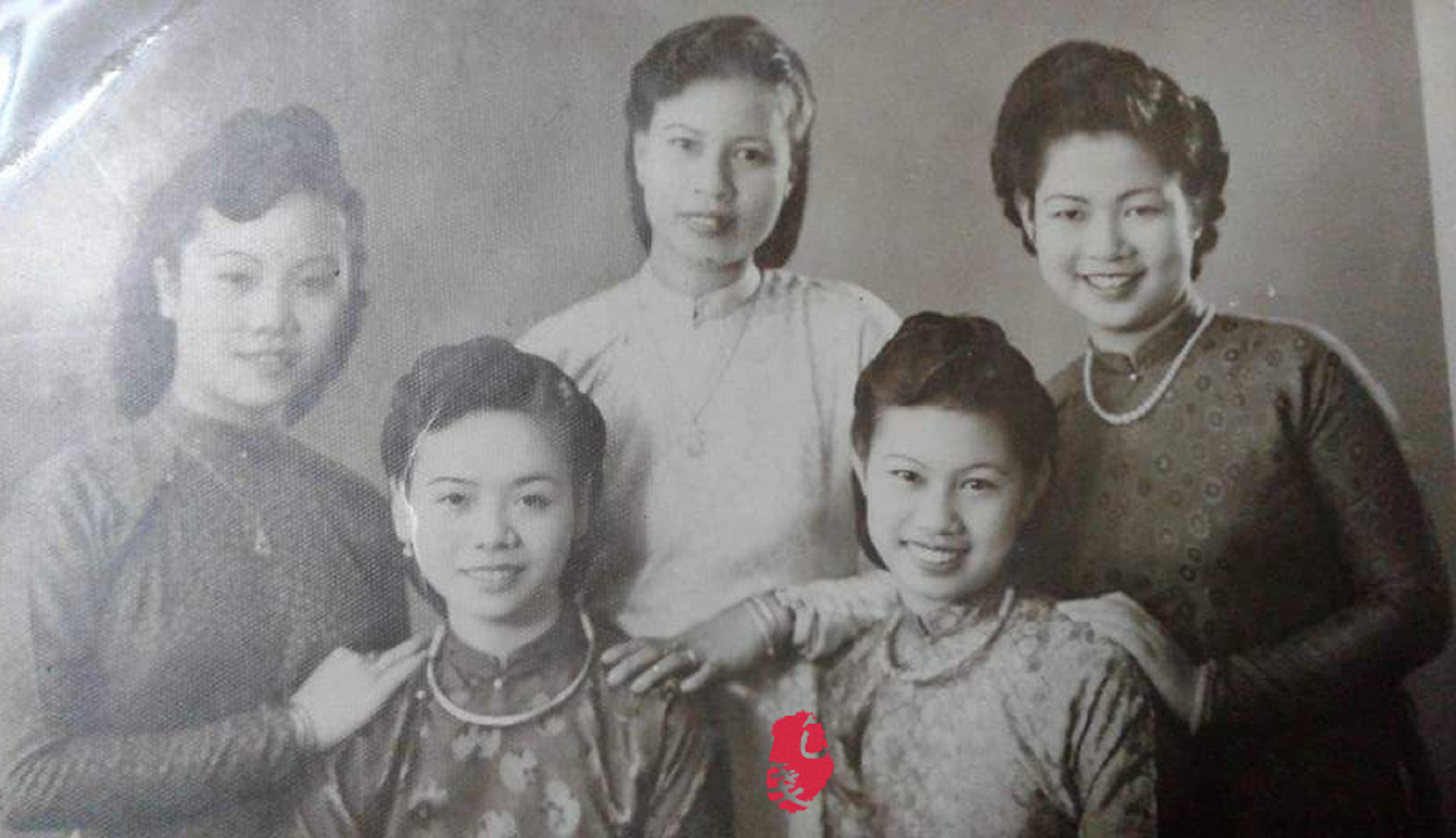
Five sisters in Hanoi, circa 1950–1953

France desired trading freedom in Vietnam. They also wanted to bring more missionaries into the country. The Nguyen dynasty disliked French involvement in Vietnam, and executed several missionaries and Vietnamese coverts. This spurred the French Emperor, Napoleon III, to attack Vietnam and attempt to force the court to accept the title of "French protectorate". The French were successful despite the resistance they encountered, and by the 1880s Vietnam was officially a French protectorate.

Feminism, along with liberalism, socialism and Marxism, flowed into Vietnam as the ramifications of French rule. The French narrative in the 19th century employed the oppressed Vietnamese women image to justify French control over Vietnam as a mean to emancipate Vietnamese women from Vietnamese patriarchal institutions that the French identified as "stemmed out from Chinese cultural domination", thus serving the broader goal of modernizing Vietnam using Western enlightened democratic principles. Vietnamese nationalists later however tried to push back this narrative, arguing that women's rights and freedom and democratic values, were already ingrained in Vietnamese traditions before the Chinese domination and French colonial rule.

Vietnamese Communist Party's narrative blames the Chinese rule and Confucian doctrines of Lê and Nguyễn dynasties for the oppression of Vietnamese women.

Vietnamese women were often married to European men. This was particularly true in the upper-class, where marriage to a European male was seen as an opportunity for advancement. Often, this marriage was a temporary arrangement. A Vietnamese women married a European man for a certain amount of time. Since objects like clothes, coins, or jewelry were given in exchange for sex, women could make a profit in this way. When their European husband left, the woman were often remarried. This was seen as a profitable arrangement for most parties. In fact, Vietnamese nobles had "thought it no Shame or Disgrace to marry their Daughters to English and Dutch Seamen, for the Time they were to stay in Tonquin, and often presented their Sons in Law pretty handsomly [sic] at their departure, especially if they left their Wives with Child". In this way, the marriage and subsequent departure of a foreign husband was seen as an opportunity for social advancement, and there was not a stigma surrounding the "abandoned wife". There was almost an aura surrounding a woman who married a foreign man, rather than a stigma. It was believed that "When [a trader] wants to depart he gives whatever is promised, and so they leave each other in friendship and she may then look for another man as she wishes in all propriety, without scandal."

According to some historians, European men perceived Southeast Asian women as beautiful, immodest and not concerned with chastity. This facilitated an environment more open to rape and abduction. European religious leaders began blaming East Asian women for being prostitutes, and the temporary marriages came to be seen as shameful instead of honorable. They were labeled as "prostitutes" and assumed to be of the lower-classes. Historian Barbara Andaya said that although "well into the nineteenth century Europeans continued to take concubines, the tendency to see concubines akin to prostitutes meant that the standing of the temporary wife had been fundamentally eroded."

Cantonese outlaw bandit pirates in the Guangdong maritime frontier with Vietnam in the 17th, 18th and 19th centuries raped Vietnamese women and Vietnamese boys.

Vietnamese women and girls were mass trafficked from Vietnam to China during French colonial rule by Chinese and Vietnamese pirates and agencies. French Captain Louis de Grandmaison claimed that these Vietnamese women did not want to go back to Vietnam and they had families in China and were better off in China. Vietnamese women were in demand because of a lower number of Chinese women available in China and along the borderlands of China there were some Chinese men who had no women and needed Vietnamese women. Vietnamese women in the Red River delta were taken to China by Chinese recruitment agencies as well as Vietnamese women who were kidnapped from villages which were raided by Vietnamese and Chinese pirates. The Vietnamese women became wives, prostitutes, or slaves.

Vietnamese women were viewed in China as "inured to hardship, resigned to their fate, and in addition of very gentle character" so they were wanted as concubines and servants in China and the massive traffick of Tongkinese (North Vietnamese) women to China started in 1875. There was massive demand for Vietnamese women in China. Southern Chinese ports were the destination of the children and women who were kidnapped by Chinese pirates from the area around Haiphong in Vietnam. Children and pretty women were taken by the pirates in their raids on Vietnamese villages. A major center for human trafficking of the slaves was Hai Phong. The Vietnamese children and women were kidnapped and brought to China to become slaves by both Chinese and Vietnamese pirates.

Mung, Meo, Thai, and Nung minority women in Tonkin's mountains were kidnapped by Vietnamese pirates and Chinese pirates to bring to China. The anti-French Can Vuong rebels were the source of the Vietnamese bandits while former Taiping rebels were the source of the Chinese rebels. These Vietnamese and Chinese pirates fought against the French colonial military and ambushed French troops, receiving help from regular Chinese soldiers to fight against the French. Chinese and Nung pirates fought against Meo. The T'ai hated the Viet Minh and fought against them in 1947. Nung were said to be fit for banditry and piracy.

In Vietnam, women's rights and position were traditionally regulated not by Buddhism but by Confucianism, in which women had a low status centered around obedience toward father, husband and son. The French colonial authorities did support women's education, while the girls' schools opened during the colonial period mainly benefitted the urban elite. A debate around women's rights and a first wave of feminism started with French educated Vietnamese urban elite women in the 20th-century, voiced by the first women's press, such as the first women's magazine, the Nu Gioi Chuong (Women's Bell) founded by the first woman editor Suong Nguyet Anh 1919, and Phu Nu Tan Van (Women's News) from 1929. The first feminist women's organization in Vietnam was the Nu Cong Hoc Hoi under Madame Nguyen Khoa Tung (Dam Phuong) in Hue in 1926, who voiced the demands of the bourgouise women's movement, which mainly centered around educational and professional opportunities, polygamy and child marriage. The Vietnamese women's movement was in effect incorporated into the Vietnamese Women's Union (VWU) of the Communistic Indochinese Communist Party (ICP) in the 1930s.

=== Vietnamese Nationalist movement ===
In 1930, urban intellectual elites began to talk about women's ability to escape their confined social sphere through novels like Nhat Linh's Noan Tuyet, in which the heroine escapes from a marriage she was coerced into and wins social approval for it. The heroine's true love was a member of the nationalist party. According to this book and other authors like Phan Boi Chau, there was an evident link between the nationalist movement and an increase in women's rights. Following the nationalist military leadership of the Trung sisters, other women became heavily involved in non-communist nationalist movements, especially in the Vietnam Nationalist Party. By the end of the 1930s, women's liberation had become a more common topic in the literature written by urban intellectual elites, and women had entered political life.

The Lao Dong party (Vietnam Worker's Party) was created in 1945 after the Indochinese Party was dissolved. It was led by Ho Chi Minh until his death, and controlled the Democratic Republic of Vietnam. The Lao Dong Party claims to have advanced women's rights by publicizing Vietnamese women's achievements and allowing women to serve in the government and communist delegations. The party advocated and pushed for greater equality between the sexes, and said that the prior wave of women's liberation movements in the upper bourgeoisie during the 1930s was more of an advocacy for quick divorce, and did not attempt to liberate women as a whole. It said,

"petty-bourgeois feminists reduced the cause of the inequality of the sexes and the bondage of women to economic dependence. They timidly suggested that the woman be trained in certain trades 'in keeping with her femininity and not detrimental to her mission as a mother.' (Dam Phuong, The Woman and the Family, 1929). This 'sacred mission' was in fact but domestic slavery, the drudgery that was the lot of women in patriarchal families, which the feminists did not dare to oppose. And they hardly dared to mention this 'risky' question: that of liberation from foreign rule."

Nationalist movements like the Lao Dong Party used the liberation of women to show where they planned to lead the country and emphasized the poor rights for women during colonial rule and under French influence. These nationalist movements stressed the idea that women were oppressed under the French occupation and espoused the idea that liberation for women could only come through a nationalist revolution. They recognized that gender equality was an issue that cut across social lines and could be used to build nationalist support. When the Party Central Committee was asked to rank the ten "essential tasks of the revolution", it ranked equal rights for women as ninth and its stance on women's rights was intentionally vague. Women did participate in the revolution against the French that occupied Vietnam. They served as nurses, guides, couriers, and propagandists. While they were not allowed in the regular army, they fought in militia and guerrilla units on the home front. The slogan for women in the Resistance was "Let women replace men in all tasks in the rear", which was an accurate description of their main role in the Revolution- laboring in the agricultural sector as Vietnamese men fought for Vietnam's independence from the French. The Revolution did not result in immediate empowerment, as only 10 of the 403 seats in the 1946–1960 Nationalist Assemblies were occupied by women. It did spread feminist ideology, however.

=== Gender relations before the Vietnam War ===
The Woman's Union of the 1930s pushed for women's interests and managed to extend paid maternity leave for government employees. The Woman's Union also received a governmental guarantee that they would be consulted before the government implemented any policies that could affect women's health. The Woman's Union is one of the organizations that pushed for such change, and they experienced pushback on their efforts. The paid maternity leave for government employees, which was extended from three to six months, was changed back to three months years after its passing. Vietnam was extending greater rights to females. In 1949, the state of Vietnam was created during the first Indochina War, in which Vietnam attempted to gain independence from France. A move towards equality was evident in the original constitution of the 1949 Democratic Republic of Vietnam, which stated that "women are equal to men in all respects." The Constitution also contained clauses calling for paid maternity leave and equal pay for equal work. The 1959 Marriage and Family Law made further progress as it worked on ending systems of concubines, child marriage and forced marriage. While these changes occurred in large part because socialist leaders wanted women to be able to work in the industrial and agricultural sectors, they did promote more rapid change in women's traditional roles. Under the socialist regime, female and male literacy increased.

== Vietnam War (1955–1975) ==
=== Women's roles ===
North Vietnamese women were enlisted and fought in the combat zone and provided manual labor to keep the Ho Chi Minh trail open. They also worked in the rice fields in North Vietnam and Viet Cong-held farming areas in South Vietnam's Mekong Delta region to provide food for their families and the communist war effort. Women were enlisted in the North Vietnamese Army (NVA) and the Viet Cong guerrilla insurgent force in South Vietnam. Some women also served for the North Vietnamese and Viet Cong intelligence services. In South Vietnam, some women voluntarily serve in the ARVN's Women's Armed Force Corps (WAFC) and other Women's corps in the military. Some, like in the WAFC, fought in combat with other soldiers. Others have served as nurses and doctors in the battlefield and in military hospitals, or served in South Vietnam or America's intelligence agencies. During Diệm's presidency, Madame Nhu was the commander of the WAFC. In order to boost morale among male soldiers, North Vietnamese women were recruited from youth volunteer groups to drive truckloads of soldiers up and down the Ho Chi Minh trail, while American pilots were conducting bombing raids. The purpose of this was to show the male soldiers that if women can do it, they could as well.

Vietnam split into two parts, North and South Vietnam, in 1954. The revolutionary socialist government in the North wanted to enhance social equity, sometimes by improving women's rights. The 1960 Marriage and Family Law, for example, banned forced marriage, child marriage, wife beating, and concubinage. The regime also focused on moving women outside of the home. They did this for the purpose of industrial development. They promoted the power of the Women's Union, which pushed for women's rights and also rallied support for the Communist government's new laws. The government of North Vietnam influenced the role of women during the war of reunification during the 1960s, when mobilizing women was viewed as crucial to winning the war. During this time, the Women's Union encouraged women to fulfill three main responsibilities. These were: encouraging their male relatives to fight in the war, taking all of the household burdens on themselves, and taking jobs in the industrial and agricultural workforces. In 1967, the Communist Party's Central Committee called for formal quotas in employment. The commission asked that women occupy at least 35 percent of all jobs, and 50-70 percent of jobs in education. Most of these quotas were filled by the 1970s.

The Vietnam War lasted from 1956 to 1975. In 1967, with the Vietnam War well under way, the Communist Party's Central Committee in North Vietnam passed resolution 153. This resolution passed formal job quotas, requiring women to hold a minimum of 35% of all jobs and 50–70% of job in the educational sector. They passed this resolution because, with so many Vietnamese men away at war, they needed more women to support the economy. A similar infiltration occurred in the political arena, where the "percentage of women on people's councils, the major administrative bodies, increased at the provincial, district, and commune levels from 22.8, 20.8, and 16.5 percent in 1965 to 34.8, 40.0, and 40.9 percent by 1972." While this was the greatest involvement of women in the political sphere in Vietnam's history, men maintained their hold on leadership positions across the board, not only in the political arena. When the war ended, female involvement decreased, actually sinking below its pre-war involvement rates.

Several laws influenced women's rights in the time period following the Vietnam war and reunification. The Family Law of 1986 doubled the length of maternity leave from three to six months, while the 1988 Council of Minster's Decision number 163 gave the Women's Union the right to be involved in any decision relevant to the welfare of women or children. The desire for economic efficiency under the free market reforms of the new regime caused some of these reforms to be scaled back. Maternity leave, for example, was shortened to four months when employers began complaining that they lost money by hiring women. There are no other organizations like the Women's Union, as the Vietnamese government is very careful about the nongovernmental organizations they allow to exist. The Vietnamese Women's Association exists largely to increase the power of the Communist Party, so it is not always able to fully support women's interests.

=== Woman refugees ===
Brothels in Bangkok bought kidnapped Vietnamese women fleeing South Vietnam after the Vietnam war who were taken by pirates.

== Socialist Republic of Vietnam ==
During the Sino-Vietnamese War Vietnamese women were used for propaganda images on both sides, as the Vietnamese released pictures of Vietnamese women militia with captured Chinese male troops while the Chinese released pictures of injured Vietnamese women prisoners being treated well by Chinese. The Chinese held 1,636 Vietnamese prisoners and the Vietnamese held 238 Chinese prisoners; they were exchanged in May–June 1979. The 238 Chinese male soldiers surrendered after getting separated from their main unit during the withdrawal from Vietnam and became surrounded by Vietnamese. After surrendering, they were transferred by the Vietnamese soldiers to a prison. The Chinese prisoners reported that they were subjected to torturous and inhuman treatment, such as being blindfolded and having their bodies bound and restrained with metal wire. Vietnamese women soldiers made up one-third of the guards who held the Chinese male prisoners captive in the prison. The Vietnamese arranged for foreign journalists to take photographs of Chinese male soldiers held captive by Vietnamese women militia with Type-56 rifles. Vietnam Pictorial published a collage contrasting a photo of a Vietnamese female fighter and a Chinese male prisoner with an earlier photo of a Vietnamese female fighter and American male prisoner for propaganda purposes. Some of the Vietnamese soldiers taken prisoner by China were women, and they were exchanged for the captured Chinese men.

In Vietnam during the 1960s and 1970s, the newly-powerful socialists promoted equal access to education for women and men. The reunification of North and South Vietnam after the Vietnam War, in 1976, also allowed women to take on leadership roles in politics. One author said that Vietnam during the 1980s was "a place where, after exhausting work and furious struggle, women can be confident that they travel the path which will some day arrive at their liberation." Some historians have argued that women's advocates in Vietnam "have been weakened in the post-reunification era due in part to the implementation of free market reforms in a nondemocratic political context." The resource constraints were detrimental to women's rights, as was the political atmosphere after the war. The new state implemented free market economics while political participation was not expanded. The tight political atmosphere and resource-constraints weakened the Vietnam Women's Union, which was accustomed to speaking on behalf of women under Vietnam's single-party rule. After the war was over, it was no longer seen as a crucial organization by the government. Political reunification also resulted in the end of the quota system and the subsequent decrease in women in the National Assembly. There was also an increase in occupational segregation as women returned to more roles within the home and men returned from the war. Free-market policies known as the Đổi Mới put female-headed households in rural areas at a disadvantage by limiting their access to credit.

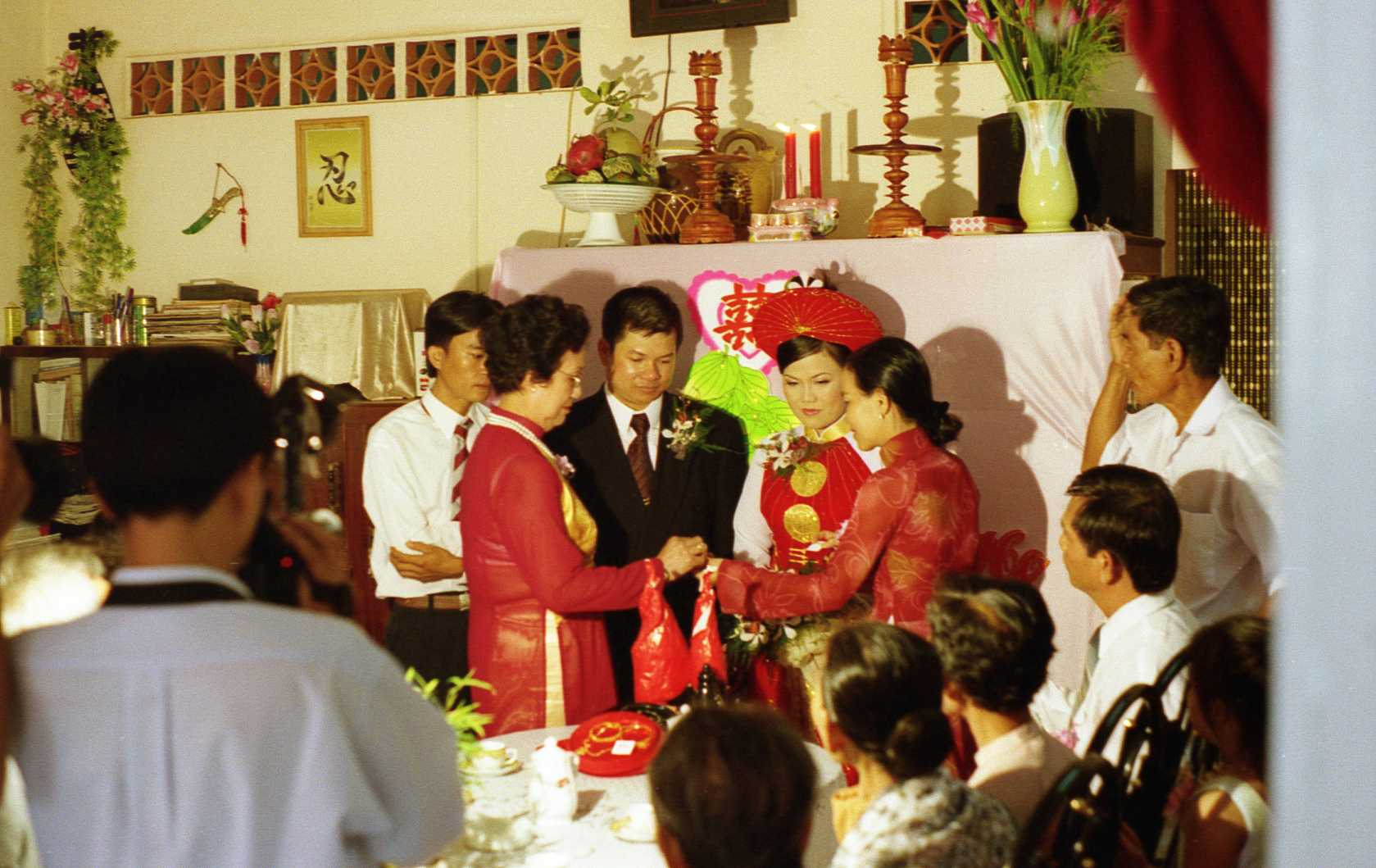
Traditional Vietnamese country wedding ceremony

Women occupy both the domestic and outside sector. Women's participation in the economy, government, and society has increased. In the domestic sphere, less progress has been made to improve gender relations. Traditional Confucian patriarchal values have continued to persist, as well as a continued emphasis on the family unit. This has comprised the main criticism of Vietnam Women's Union, an organization that works towards advancing women's rights. Shifts in Vietnam's sex ratio show an increased number of men outnumbering women, which some researchers have stated to in part be caused by the two-child policy in Vietnam.

=== Family ===
==== Marriage ====
Following their colonization by European powers, some lost their standing and were placed in the domestic sphere. Instead of being involved in their society, women worked as trade intermediaries and were expected to marry and become housewives. This shift in gender roles became a new cultural practice and lasted for years until the Vietnam War, when women in rural Vietnam became discouraged from marrying and female singlehood became a growing trend. A belief was that after the mid-twenties, women were considered undesirable and marriage was a way of life. The cap for marriage was at this age because after this time, women could no longer bear children, a necessity for the survival of the family name. In addition, the notion of "a one-person, self-sufficient household was not very acceptable" and was looked at as selfish and lonely. After the age of twenty-five, single women enter a period where they "make the transition from temporary to permanent non-marriage." As they go through this period, society perceived them as being "wishful" or even "regretful". When women were interviewed, nearly all showed no sign of remorse from rejecting marriage proposals during their prime ages for marriage. They were happy with their decision to opt out of a possible "miserable" life with a husband.

Familial obligations, especially during the Vietnam War, forced some women to put off marriage until they reached an age where they were viewed as "unfavorable". From a younger age, the eldest child of a Vietnamese family had a variety of obligations to uphold. One of which was having to care for their younger siblings. During time of war, it was difficult for the parents to overlook agricultural labor while taking care of all their children.

Studies have shown there are marriage discrepancies between rural and urban areas in Vietnam. According to Nguyen et al., women from rural areas were shown to enter marriage at a younger age than women from urban areas. Evidence has shown that there is a difference in marital and familial values between north and south Vietnam. According to one study, these differences between the north and south regions are likely due to their separation during the 20th century, as well as the degree of socialist or western influences on the north and south, respectively. The cultural differences between northern and southern Vietnam include "marriage rituals, family living arrangement, household composition, and premarital sexual behaviors" according to a study by Teerawichitchainan et al.

==== Domestic role ====
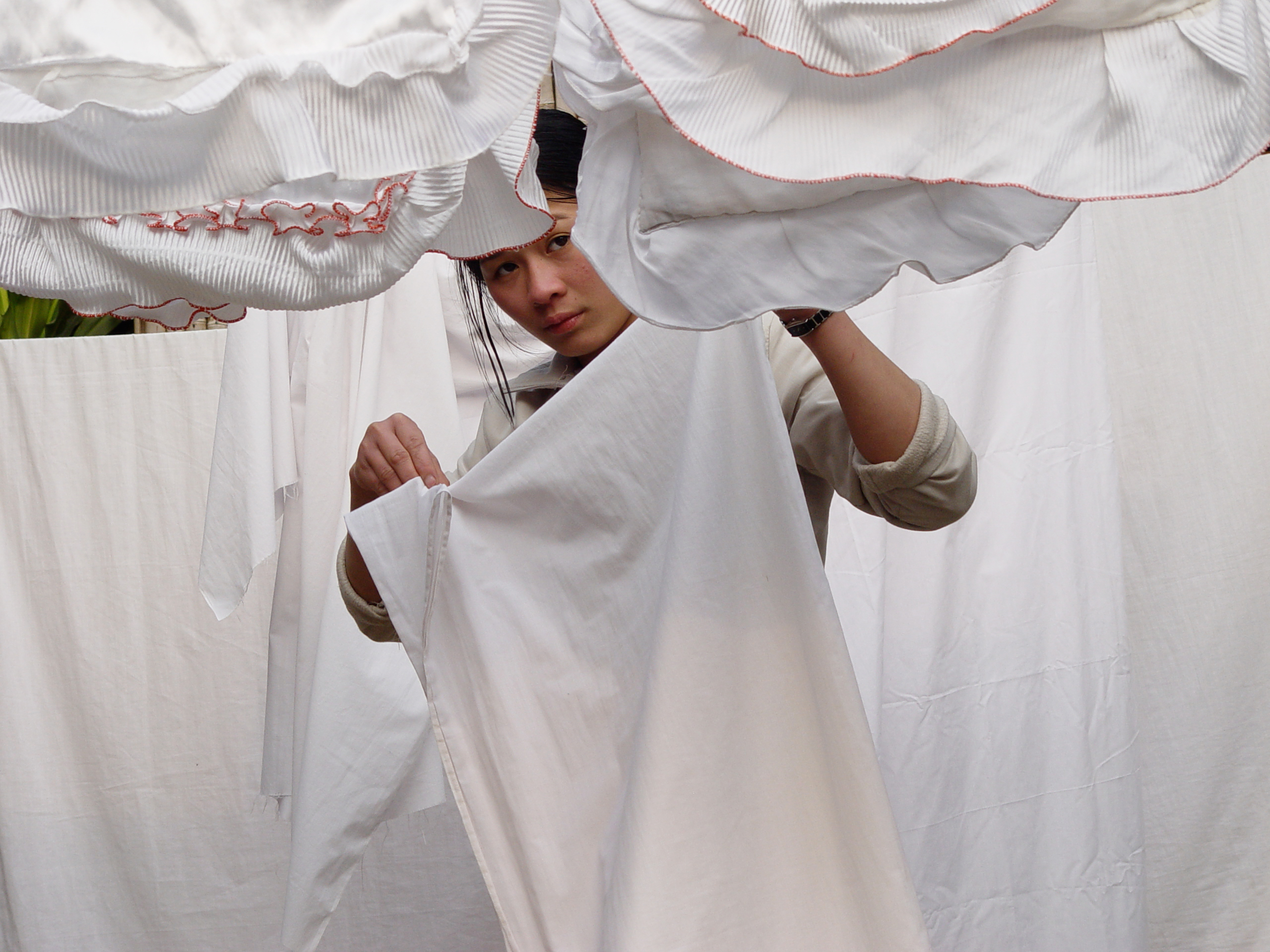
Woman with laundry, Mai Chau, Vietnam

Confucianism's emphasis on the family still impacts Vietnamese women's lives, especially in rural areas, where it espouses the importance of premarital female virginity and condemns abortion and divorce. Household chores and labor are still primarily performed by Vietnamese women; women in Vietnam have shown increased influence in familial decisions, such as household budgets and the education of the children. In terms of childcare responsibility, men have shown an increased participation at the earlier ages of childcare, while women overall still bear the main responsibility. Women are seen primarily as mothers, and are considered to have shown "respect" to their husband's lineage if they give birth to a boy. While patrilineal ancestor worship shows girls as "outside lineage" (họ ngoại), it consider boys to be "inside lineage" (họ nội). Vietnamese society tends to follow the ancestral line through males, pushing women to the periphery. Vietnam has a two child policy. Some families want at least one boy, and would prefer two boys to two girls, so they use ultrasound machines to determine the baby's sex to later abort female offspring.

The main religion in Vietnam are traditional folk religion (see Vietnamese folk religion). This is not an organized religion and adopts some Confucian views. One of the main views that it takes from Confucius is the Patrilineal Society. Men are the head of the family and more their lineage is to be protected. As it pertains to motherhood, Vietnam women are seen as and used primarily as mothers. In Vietnam, mothers-in-law are revealed as the staunch enforcers of the norm related to childcare, the ones who would most disapprove if the man does more childcare than the woman. Female virginity is of extreme importance, especially in rural areas, and the Society condemns abortion and female divorce. If a woman wants to show respect to her husband, the best way she can do that is to bear him a son.

There are several patterns in birth rates amongst Vietnamese women. In one 2008 study by Nguyen et al., most women were found to have given birth by the time they reached age 20. The same study has found that the higher education level a woman received, the later the age at which she gives birth to her first child.

==== Domestic violence ====
The issue of domestic violence has faced scrutiny in Vietnam. In 2007, Vietnamese legislation passed the Law on Prevention and Control Domestic Violence, which reported that 32% of Vietnamese women have suffered sexual violence from their spouses, while 54% of women in Vietnam have suffered from emotional violence. Speculation has rose on the viability of divorce as a solution to those in situations of domestic violence. This is due to the prevalent local attitudes and measures taken towards preventing divorce in order to preserve the family unit, rather than helping victims escape domestic abuse. Surveys have indicated that 87% of domestic violence victims in Vietnam do not seek support for their situation.

In a study comparing Chinese and Vietnamese attitudes towards women, more Vietnamese than Chinese said that the male should dominate the family and a wife had to provide sex to her husband at his will. Violence against women was supported by more Vietnamese than Chinese. Domestic violence was more accepted by Vietnamese women than Chinese women.

==== International marriage ====
Some Vietnamese women from Lào Cai who married Chinese men stated that among their reasons for doing so was that Vietnamese men beat their wives, engaged in affairs with mistresses, and refused to help their wives with chores, while Chinese men actively helped their wives carry out chores and care for them. Vietnamese women are traveling to China as mail order brides for rural Chinese men to earn money for their families and a rise in the standard of living, matchmaking between Vietnamese women and Chinese men has increased and has not been affected by troubled relations between Vietnam and China. Vietnamese mail order brides have also gone to Taiwan and South Korea for marriage.

Several cases have occurred where Vietnamese women were abducted or deceived to be sold to Chinese men. Totalling several thousands, in some cases the victims were underage.

=== Sex ratio ===
Studies have shown a shift in Vietnam's sex ratio to match that of other countries in the region, where proportions are uneven and men outnumber women. In 2006, the sex ratio was found to be 110 men per 100 women throughout Vietnam, higher than the established normal sex ratio of 106 men per 100 women. Researchers have pointed to the preference for a small family size, which stems from Vietnam's two-child policy, preference for sons, and increase in ultrasound and abortion usage for the cause of the sex ratio shift.

==== Sex-selective abortions ====
In 1988, Vietnam introduced its "two-child policy". This policy was introduced because of the population size of Vietnam. Because of the policy, if a woman gave birth to a son first, the chances of her having a second child dropped even if she desired to have more children. If a woman gave birth to a daughter first, she was more than likely to have a second child even if she did not wish to have additional children. This is because families in most cases would rather have at least one boy. To ensure the sex of children, Vietnamese families have increasingly been using ultrasound technology and enhancing and developing the produced images. This sometimes leads to the abortion of female offspring. As of 20th century, economist Amartya Sen has noted the advent of sex-selective abortions to further increase the phenomenon of "missing women" worldwide. This notion alludes to the worsening of the women-to-men ratio, with men continuing to outnumber women.

==== Female mortality ====
Since 1970, overall child mortality rates have declined. Contrary to nearby countries such as India and China, male child mortality rates have shown to be higher than female child mortality rates most years from 1970 to 2000. In a study done by Pham et al., boys are 30% more likely than girls to die before a specified age.

=== Education ===
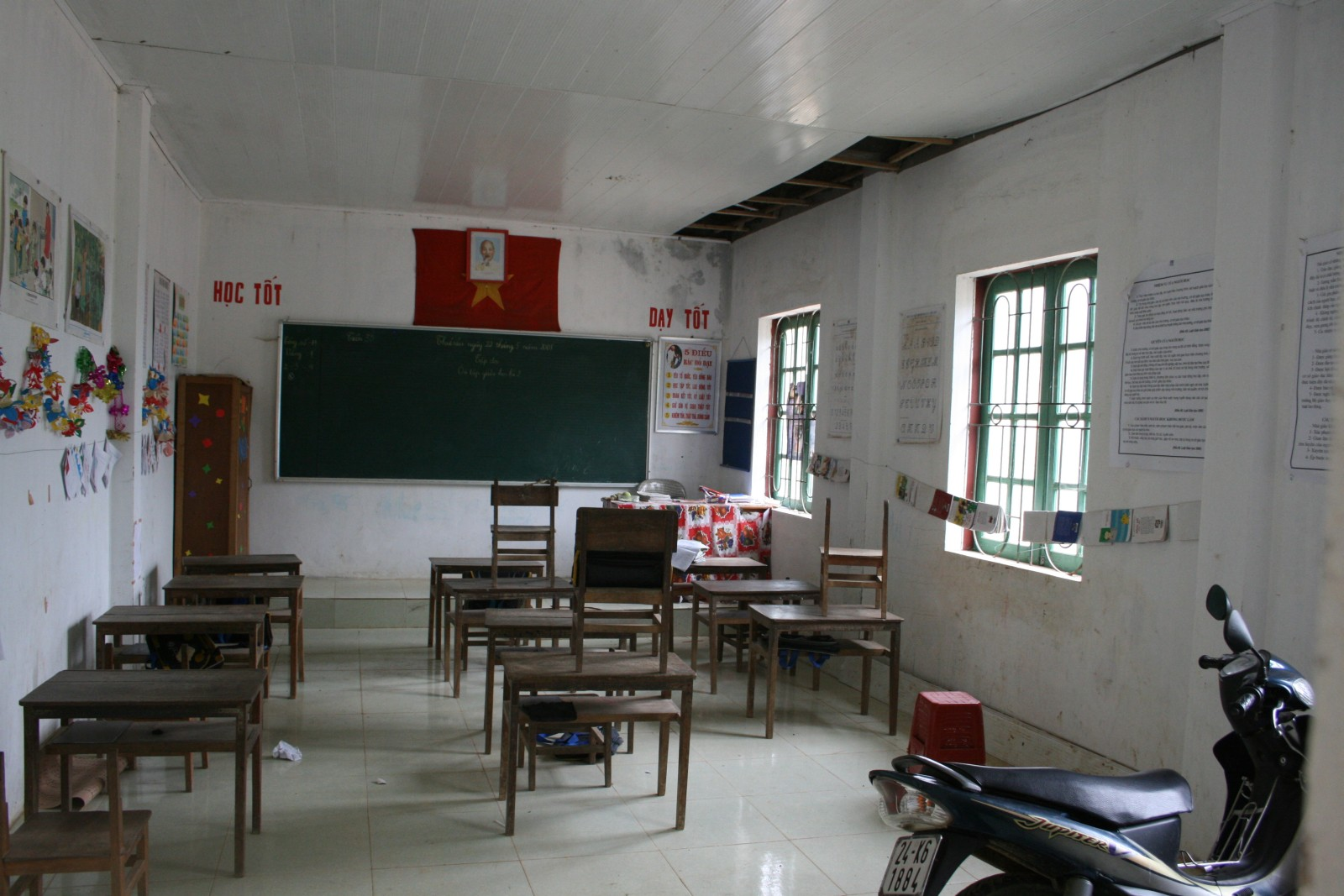
School classroom in the rural district of Tam Đường

Regarding difference in access to education between females and males, regional differences are present, especially amongst the mountainous northern regions. For example, in one study, the region of Lai Chau was found to have a literacy rate for men double that of the women's literacy rate in the region.

There is a gender gap in education, with males being more likely to attend school and sustain their education than females.

=== Economy ===
There has been economic advancement for women, especially for middle-class Vietnamese women. Middle-class women have increasingly become more involved in the workforce sector outside of the house, with 83% of "working-age women" being involved in the labor force. These women have been taking on professions dealing with a variety of fields such as sales, marketing, and advertising. Women in the workforce and economy experience higher wages than the generations before them. Research has shown that some inequalities for women still exist, with women still receiving uneven employment benefits compared to their male counterparts. According to one study, 76% of women in the labor force are concentrated in the agricultural sector. And while under 10% of women in the labor force work in textile industry, 80% of laborers in the textile industry are women.

Local credit associations do not feel secure giving loans to single mothers, which has resulted in a poverty increase for households that are led by a woman.

On October 20, 2021, The Japan International Cooperation Agency (JICA) signed a $75 million loan agreement with the Vietnam Prosperity Joint Stock Commercial Bank (VP Bank) to provide financial access to women-led small and medium-sized enterprises.

==== Gender pay gap ====
The average wage in the country of Vietnam was US$1,540 in 2012. In 2011, studies showed "that women earn 13% less than men." The 2012 survey on workers’ salaries carried out by the Vietnam General Confederation of Labour (VGCL) in enterprises nationwide revealed that female workers’ salaries are 70–80% of their male colleagues’. The global average gender pay gap is hovering around 17%. According to Nguyen Kim Lan, ILO national project coordinator, the only 2 occupational fields where pay is equal is in logistics, and household care. One reason for the disparity is that companies view women as wanting to stay at home and perform more gender role duties. More than 70% of laborers in Vietnam are women. The International Labour Organizations stated that the gender pay gap has started to increase, according to the ILO Global Wage Report during the 2012-13 period, compared to 1999–2007. A 2% increase in the gap was recorded in Vietnam in the period.

=== Politics ===
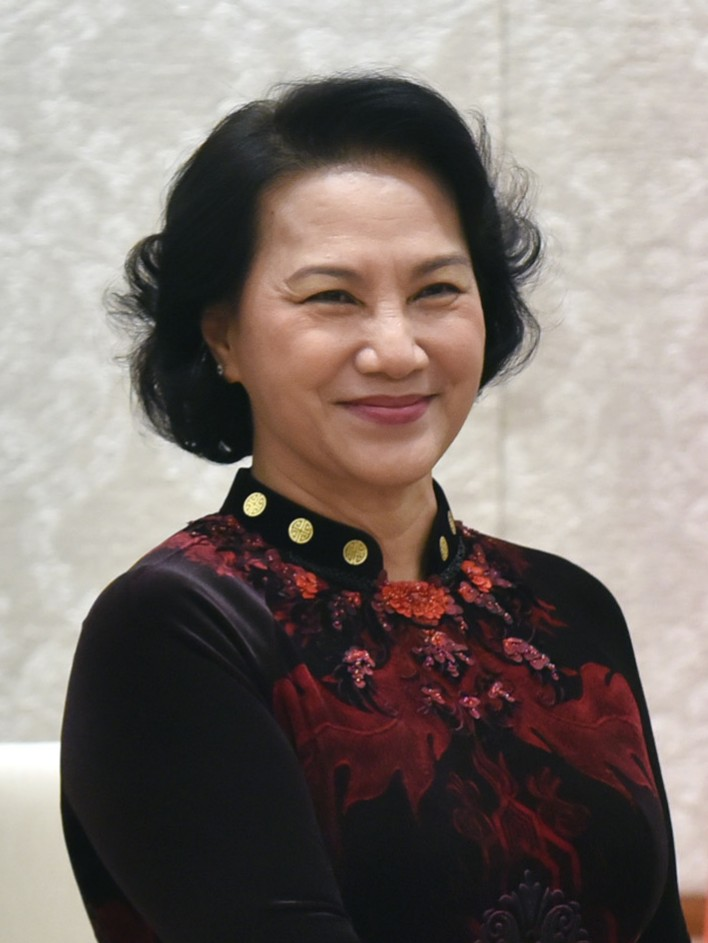
Nguyễn Thị Kim Ngân, Chairwoman of the National Assembly, was voted 5th most admired woman in Vietnam in a 2020 YouGov poll

Women's participation in the National Assembly was at its lowest since 1997. Within the Vietnam Communist Party, women's membership has climbed, and in 2010 was 33%, an increase from 2005 when women's membership was 21.9%. On the regional level, women occupy 23% of district positions, and 23% of municipal positions. Like the United Nation Millennium Development Goals, the Vietnamese government has also developed their own set of goals committed to increasing the percent of women in government, which in 2011 was still at 30%. One example of Vietnam's efforts to improve women representation are in the National Strategy for the Advancement of Women, which set goals to be reached by 2010. Vietnam has fallen short of most of its stated goals. There are several reasons that the government has not been able to meet its quota to have more women in government. The reasons include factors such as "inadequate government regulations, lack of implementation of existing policies, cultural factors, and inherent systemic bias towards men." Some women that want to engage in politics are discouraged because of age-related training eligibility criteria and a retirement age that is five years earlier than males, with males having a retirement age of 60 and women having a retirement age of 55. Workplace attitudes are challenges for women to achieve their aspiration of leadership positions. Unlike males, women are harassed more in their occupations, and promotion is dependent upon the supervisors discretion and how he feels about gender promotion.

The position of the Vice President of Vietnam was held by Đặng Thị Ngọc Thịnh, with this being the highest office to be held by a woman in Vietnam. During the 2002 to 2007 term, all of the minister positions comprising the government cabinet were held by men. These statistics have constituted some leaders advocating for greater representation for women in leader positions. To implement this goal, a National Strategy on Gender Equality was implemented in 2011 through to 2020.

=== Human trafficking ===
Since the 1980s, some women from Vietnam have become victims of kidnapping, the bride-buying trade, and human trafficking and prostitution in China., Taiwan, South Korea, and in the cases of human trafficking, prostitution and sexual slavery, Cambodia. The struggle of the Vietnamese female victims of "bride-brokers" can be summarized by the larger-than-life poem known as "The Tale of Kieu", which narrates the story of a female protagonist of Vietnam who was purchased by foreigners and was violated, and kept fighting back against her captors and offenders. Women and girls from all ethnic groups and foreigners have been victims of sex trafficking in Vietnam.

The main human rights issue in Southeast Asia is human trafficking. According to one study, Southeast Asia is a large source of human trafficking, with many individuals who fall victim to human trafficking being sent to Australia. Vietnam, as well as other countries such as Cambodia, Laos, and the Philippines, are major source countries for human trafficking. Southeast Asian countries preference for boys over girls is further tipping the balance between the sexes in the region, already skewed by a bias for boys. The trend has led to increased trafficking of women. While some of the victims that are a part of human trafficking are forced/kidnapped/enslaved, others were lured in under the assumption that they were getting a better job. According to a policy brief on human trafficking in Southeast Asia, while victims include girls, women, boys, and men, the majority are women. Women tend to be more highly targeted by traffickers due to the fact that they are seeking opportunity in an area of the world where limited economic opportunities are available for them. Unskilled and poorly educated women are commonly led into human trafficking. According to the UNODC report, the numbers for women and men in forced labor may be skewed due to the fact that only a few countries released the numbers for adult men. What is known is that women are trafficked the most. The main causes of human trafficking in Southeast Asia are universal factors such as poverty and globalization. Industrialization is arguably also another factor of human trafficking. Some scholars argue that industrialization of booming economies, like that of Thailand and Singapore, created a draw for poor migrants seeking upward mobility and individuals wanting to leave war torn countries. These migrants were an untapped resource in growing economies that had already exhausted the cheap labor from within its borders. A high supply of migrant workers seeking employment and high demand from an economy seeking cheap labor creates a perfect combination for human traffickers to thrive. The sex industry emerged in Southeast Asia in the 20th century as a way for women to generate more income for struggling migrants and locals trying to support families or themselves. Sex industries first catered to military personnel on leave from bases and as military installations began to recede the industry turned its attention to growing tourism. Even as the industry is looked down upon later there is still an underground market that is demanding from traffickers.

Between 2005 and 2009, 6,000 women, as well as younger girls, were found to be in the human trafficking statistic. The majority of the women and girls are trafficked to China, 30% are trafficked to Cambodia, and the remaining 10% are trafficked to the destinations across the world.

=== Vietnam Women's Union ===
In decades, Vietnam has stressed the importance of gender equality. To address this goal, the Vietnam Women's Union, an organization founded in 1930 under the Vietnam Communist Party, has pursued the advancement of women in some arenas; they also stress some aspects of Confucian doctrine that keeps a male-dominated hierarchy in place. As of 2000, their membership has expanded to 11 million, which compromises for 60% of the female population in Vietnam over the age of 18. Because of their large membership, the Vietnam Women's Union has been regarded as the representative for women in politics. Therefore, the VWU sometimes advises during the policy-making of gender-related or women's issues. Their role has been disputed due to its shortcomings in promoting women's right effectively.

In the 1980s, the Vietnam Women's Union increased paid maternity leave and received a promise that they would be asked before the government implemented any policies that could potentially affect the welfare of women. The increased maternity leave was restored to its original length years later. While there are limits in the Vietnam Women's Union that prohibit gender change in certain areas, there does not seem to be other organized civil society groups that are fighting for women's rights. Two areas that have seen less change throughout decades are the roles women play in the family, specifically motherhood, and the human rights problems women traditionally face in the region.

In 2001, the Vietnam Women's Union was appointed to head the planning of a new legislation, a Law on Gender Equality, which set out to equalize conditions between both genders. The legislation included several stipulations, including laws pertaining to retirement age for both women and men. The law was in its final legislation processes in 2006, with it going into effect mid 2007.

==== Criticism ====
Their focus on Confucian values which uphold a male-dominated hierarchy has received criticism. In some studies, the VWU has been criticized for its lack of action against gender norms while placing too much emphasis on family structure. Furthermore, while their efforts have worked towards improving women's status, the VWU faces criticism for their lack of advocacy towards women's power.

== See also ==
- Vietnam women's football championship
- Vietnam women's national football team
- Vietnam women's national volleyball team
- Vietnam Women's Memorial
- Vietnamese people in Taiwan
- Vietnamese migrant brides in Taiwan
- Women in Asia
