= Đạm Phương =

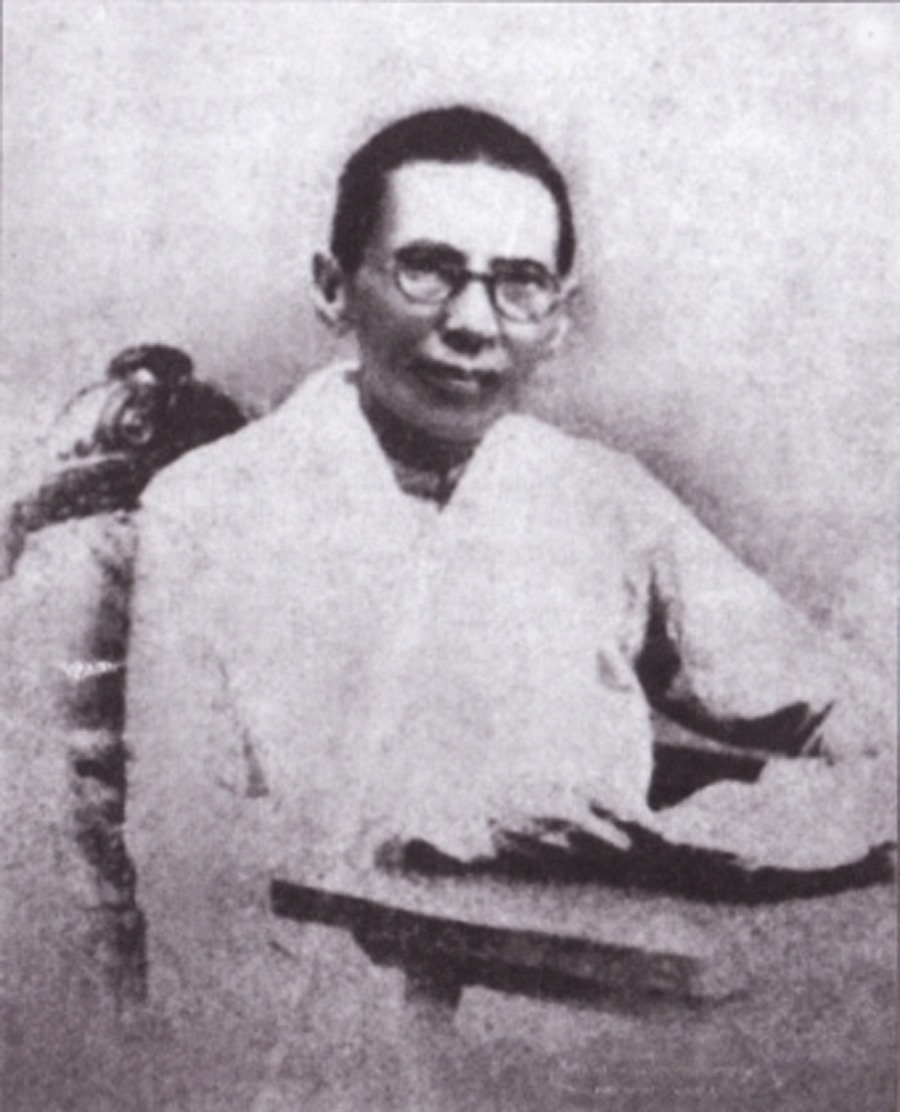
Đạm Phương

Đạm Phương (1881–1947) whose birth name was Công Ngữ Đồng Canh, often called Đạm Phương nữ sử was a poet, a popular cultural and social activist, and a writer in Vietnam during the first half of the 20th century. She was the grandchild of king Minh Mạng and the daughter of duke Nguyễn Phúc Miên STriện.

She was born on March 6, 1881, in Huế and died on December 10, 1947, in Thanh Hóa. She was invited to the palace to teach princesses and concubines when she was 20 years old in 1901. Her first newspaper was published in Nam Phong tạp chí in July 1918; she wrote over 200 newspapers articles for such newspapers such as Trung Bắc tân văn, Thực nghiệp dân báo, Hữu Thanh, Lục tỉnh tân văn from 1918 to 1929. In 1926, she joined the development and became president of the Hue City Nữ công học Hội, the first Vietnamese organization for female education. In 1928, she was jailed by the French for suspected connections with the Tân Việt Revolutionary Party. From late 1930, she quitted writing newspapers and focused on making books.

Her son was Hải Triều (1908–1954), a journalist, a Marxist theorist and a Vietnamese literary critic.

== Works ==
- Kim tú cầu (Hydrangeas) (1928)
- Hồng phấn tương tri (Bright pink rose) (1929)
- "Năm mươi năm về trước" ("50 years ago") (1940)
- Giáo dục nhi đồng (Children education) (1942)

== Opinion ==
Women are people, women are one half of humanity. If all women don't have an education, then one half of humanity are beasts.

"The work of females not only help women more independent. but it is also the road to livelihood, and is also the seeds of the industrial technology for the country in the future."

— Báo Trung Bắc tân văn, 21 June 1926
