= Sương Nguyệt Anh =

Vietnamese author, poet, feminist and editor (1864–1921)

- Born: March 8, 1864; An Binh Dong, Bến Tre province, Đại Nam
- Died: 20 January 1921 (aged 56)
- Known for: first editor of the first feminist women's magazine

Suong Nguyet Anh (8 March 1864 – 20 January 1921), was a Vietnamese author, poet, feminist and editor.

In 1919, she became the first woman editor in Vietnam when she became the first editor of the first feminist women's magazine in Vietnam, the Nu Gioi Chung (Women's Bell).

== Life and career ==
Nguyệt Anh was born on 8 March 1864 in the village of An Binh Dong within the Ben Tre province. She was educated by her father, Nguyễn Đình Chiểu, who was a poet and teacher.

She lost her father at an age of 24. Later, she and her brother took over their father's school and started running it. Upon moving to Rach Mieu in My Tho City, she married and gave birth to a daughter. Her husband passed away two years later. She went through numerous tragic moments in that decade.

On 1 February 1918, the first issue of Nu Gioi Chung (Women’s Bell) was published. She was first female editor of the newspaper.

She died on 20 January 1921.

== Tributes ==
A number of streets are named after Nguyệt Anh in cities such as Ho Chi Minh City, Da Lat, and Vũng Tàu.
