= Vietnam Women's Union =

Vietnamese organization

- Vietnamese: Hội Liên Hiệp Phụ Nữ Việt Nam
- Abbreviation: VWU
- Formation: October 20, 1930; 95 years ago
- Headquarters: 39 Hang Chuoi Street, Hanoi, Vietnam
- Members: 13,000,000 (2018)
- President: Hà Thị Nga
- Vice President: Hoàng Thị Ái Nhiên; Bùi Thị Hòa; Trần Thị Hương; Đỗ Thị Thu Thảo
- Affiliations: Vietnamese Fatherland Front; Women's International Democratic Federation; ASEAN Confederation of Women's Organizations
- Website: vwu.vn
- Formerly called: Liberalization Women's Union (1931-1945); Anti-Imperialism Women's Union (1936-1938); Democratic Women's Union (1939-1940); Women League for National Salvation (1941-1950)

The Vietnam Women's Union (Vietnamese: Hội Liên Hiệp Phụ Nữ Việt Nam, VWU) in Vietnamese, is a socio-political organization that represents and defends the legal and legitimate rights and interests of Women in Vietnam. Originally founded on October 20, 1930, there are currently over 13 million members belonging to 10,472 local women's unions in communes and towns throughout the country. The current president, for the 2017-2022 term, is President Hà Thị Nga and Vice Presidents Bùi Thị Hòa, Trần Thị Hương, Hoàng Thị Ái Nhiên, and Đỗ Thị Thu Thảo. There have been leadership changes throughout this term however. Nguyễn Thị Thu Hà was the president until April 2020 before Hà Thị Nga became the president in May 2020. Nguyễn Thị Tuyết was a Vice President until February 2020. Đỗ Thị Thu Thảo was not named Vice President until July 2018.

The VWU strives for the advancement of women's development and gender equality, representing Vietnamese women to the state and counseling on the protection of women's rights. These policies include everything from childcare, education, community services, to health education. The VWU is the first and only women's organization in modern Vietnamese history, and is a member of the local organization the Vietnamese Fatherland Front, as well as active in international institutions like the Women's International Democratic Federation (WIDF) and ASEAN Confederation of Women's Organizations (ACWO). Annually, the VWU provides nominees and recipients for the award "For the Cause of Women's Emancipation/For the Development of Women in Vietnam" which may be awarded to locals and foreigners who have made noticeable contributions to the advancement of women in Vietnam.

The establishment and growth of the VWU is dependent on the state government, as the overwhelming ideas of womanhood are combined in intertwined narratives. Both the National Party and the VWU worked to promote the “fairy-bird narrative” a blend of Marxist ideology and the idea of traditional Vietnamese womanhood, to create the current gender ideals and social priorities of the VWU. Development of a Vietnamese Woman has been the purpose of the VWU's involvement in state policies and laws, with VWU's Statutes and Resolutions focusing on educated in national tradition, moral lifestyle and gender equality, as well as training on the prevention of social vices and methods to nurture happy families.

== Current structure of the VWU ==
Currently, the Vietnam Women's Union is composed of four national levels, with elections held every five years:

1. The central level; Complete with one president and four vice presidents.
2. The provincial/municipal and equivalent level (the called “provincial level”); Divided by Vietnamese provinces complete with one president and a supportive congress.
3. The district/precinct/provincial capital and equivalent level (the called “district level”); Regional leaders and cadre leaders for each regional headquarters.
4. The commune/ward and equivalent level (the called “grassroots level”). Commune and Cadre leaders for individual villages and cities.

The highest body of the Union is the National Women's Congress. The leading body of the Union at each level is the Congress of Delegates or the Plenary Congress of all members at that level. A more detailed organizational chart of the Vietnam Women's Union can be found on their website.

Announcement of the five year goals and campaigns for the VWU are announced after the elections, and again annually should there be any changes or additions to the planning systems of the union. This is why the public announcement of planning goals are often announced in the year following the elections.

== History of the VWU’s “socialist femininity” ==
=== During French Colonialism to the Vietnam War ===
The idea of nationhood in Vietnam was popularized with women through the unity against a common enemy. By uniting against colonists—promoting the idea that the oppression of women was a necessary facet of colonial rule and that only with the overthrow of capitalist systems could women achieve equality, communists had immediate access to the social influences of women in Vietnam. Women were considered such a latent force in the Communist movement with the social unrest of women, who are generally considered to be the most exploited in all class structures and therefore more likely to support a restructuring of national rule. The Party's driving propaganda during the Vietnam War (1955-1975) was the idea that women's liberation was completely inseparable from a total social revolution. While the Party did have inefficiencies in the actual implementation of the revolutionary ideals for women in society, the party's plans for women's liberation were more driven by the ability to indoctrinate a large portion of the population to their revolutionary cause.

The Party with the help of the VWU in crafting explicit doctrines, effectively changed of traditional gendered institutions after taking power with laws establishing equal rights in politics, economic and social lives as well as equal pay and the protections of mother and child in domestic instances. The Vietnam Women's Union (VWU) was developed as a branch of the communist leadership that works for the promotion of gender equality but was originally created to bring women to support the communist revolution. This is emphasized in the official history of the Vietnam Women's Union in both their historical publications of mission statements and in present publications. The government ties currently held between the VWU and central government remain strong—with the promotion of “socialist nationalism” and the inherent image of a “true Vietnamese woman” and female nationalism, with the dichotomies between traditional values and national obligations as well as the depiction of women as key supporters for the ideas of “equality” “national modernity” and “national progress” in the establishment of new Vietnamese traditions. Considering the entwined nature of women and the party, the origin of feminine nationalism was built around creating Party support and ensuring a woman's place in the new social structure during and after the revolution. This is especially prevalent during the war period with the idea of a new modern national female—one who fought her oppressors and would even engage in combat for the good of the nation.

=== Modern conflicts in Vietnamese womanhood ===
The modern constraints on the concept of feminine nationalism is the change in national priorities for women in relation to social gender equality in religion, media, and political institutions. While purely Vietnamese nationalism is still prevalent in local events, the impact of capitalist systems is unavoidable in both national image and social institutions. Women are struggling to place themselves in the post-socialist society where being independent and embodying ideals of the war era—rejecting familial piety and choosing to fight for freedom and revolution—is now considered overtly masculine. In this time, the divergence between the national traditions emphasizing sacrifice and a Confucian sense of familial duty are both similar and incongruent, leading women to struggle to articulate themselves in the middle class. Women are fighting a catch-22 situation in terms of nationalism and political participation. If women act with traditional values, it is seen as being feudalistic, un-nationalist, and a personal fault for refusing to modernize, but if independent the nation paints women as too western, anti-nationalist, and distinctly un-Vietnamese. Women who did not adequately personify the motions of Confucian femininity, filial piety, and national ideology were considered a shame to their family.

Much of the VWU's work has focused on the promotion of personal growth to transform and empower women in daily life, which would in turn direct the nation to reformation as an “equal and better society” after reunification. Unfortunately, these hard line feminine ideals of perfection were flawed in that women were constantly overwhelmed by the responsibilities of leading a family and a nation. The efficiency and effectiveness of the VWU is contested both in application and enforcement of priorities balancing modernity and female empowerment with traditional ideologies. Vietnam's enforcement of the Four Confucian Virtues of Femininity is one such example of how the government has continually enforced gender identity upon the women of Vietnam through the VWU while maintaining a stance on promotion of equal rights and emancipation. Multiple studies have focused on the legitimacy of national VWU data and the efficiency of grassroots implementation for health services through cadre implementation—all resulting in inconclusive data. And as the union was created by the state, for the state, the data and regional work may be contested. power of the VWU as well as the lasting effects of their organizational implementations. While the VWU is promoted as a government agent of change and the Party's flagbearer of gender equality, they are accused of propagating the same dichotomy and insistence for social constructs in their policy that causes the dichotomous and unattainable images of nationalist and feminine ideals. In a targeted study on the effects of VWU policies on the livelihoods and lasting social changes on rural Vietnamese women, the VWU can symbolize the greater intentions of the Party and government to treat women as a symbol of national progress, but their implementation lacks follow-through and efficient implementation. As a state body, the necessity of the VWU working towards both the promotion of equality in government and maintaining the stance of a pro-government directly limits their efficiency of implementation and turns the body into a factory of propaganda—limiting the power to make lasting change in the nation as well as bringing the results of governmental evaluations of the body into question for validity.

== Name changes ==
The VWU has gone through several name changes since its initial foundation to better reflect the changing focuses of the organization's support. From 1931-1945 the title was the “Liberation Women’s Union” with a primary focus on rallying support for the Communist Party of Vietnam and the North Vietnam regime in the populace and combat the French colonialists in the Southern region. From 1936-1938 the name changed to the “Anti-Imperialism Women’s Union” to show their support of the Communist regime and to bring women together in opposition to the American involvement in the Vietnam War. The name again changed in 1939 until 1940 to the “Democratic Women’s Union” as well as the “Women’s League for National Salvation” during the remainder of the war until the final name change to the Vietnam Women's Union in 1950 at the first National Women's Congress. At this point, the VWU officially encouraged members to actively participate in nation building processes and support of the government through anti-French and Imperialist resistance in all aspects of their lives. Originally grown from a grassroots organization, the changing ties to the political governance in the modern union and conflicting ideologies of the union has led to a top-down implementation method for the dissemination of information.

== Timeline of policy and goals ==
=== 1955–1975 ===
The goals of the VWU during the 1950s to 1970s were to liberate South Vietnam from United States forces and Imperialist control, to enforce "the campaign of 5 goods", and to promote the social campaign of women's 3 abilities.

The campaign of 5 good refers to a social emphasis that women should participate in all aspects of the state and house, and do all responsibilities well. The 5 goods are in reference to the duties of a woman, a mother, a wife, a citizen, and a Vietnamese citizen. Each of these "goods" are descriptive of a communist Vietnamese woman, and were formatted around the ideology of the "feminine socialist" that the government was currently promoting through the VWU. "The campaign of 3 abilities” specifically planned the involvement of women during war-time, that the women should take over all jobs left by men in the war, encourage all of their male relatives to join the army, and to at all times support soldiers and even participate in combat if necessary.

In the 1950s and 1960s there was also the publication of Phụ Nữ Việt Nam (Vietnamese Woman), a magazine through which to promote “socialist womanhood”—the foundation ideology of the VWU during the Vietnam War and reform eras.

The Party has also worked with the VWU to pull women into positions of power in the new political spheres. With the 1968 mandate that women must account for at least 30% of personnel under government organization, women and their unique concerns are increasingly being drawn onto the political stage of Vietnam.

=== 1976–1985 ===
In 1976, the VWU launched a new social campaign: "New women in the national construction and defense" to promote women's involvement in nation building and social restructuring during the unification and revolution era. During this period, there was still relatively constant promotion of the “5 goods” of Vietnamese women, and the creation of separate ideologies for Vietnamese women and Vietnamese nationalists.

=== 1986–1992 ===
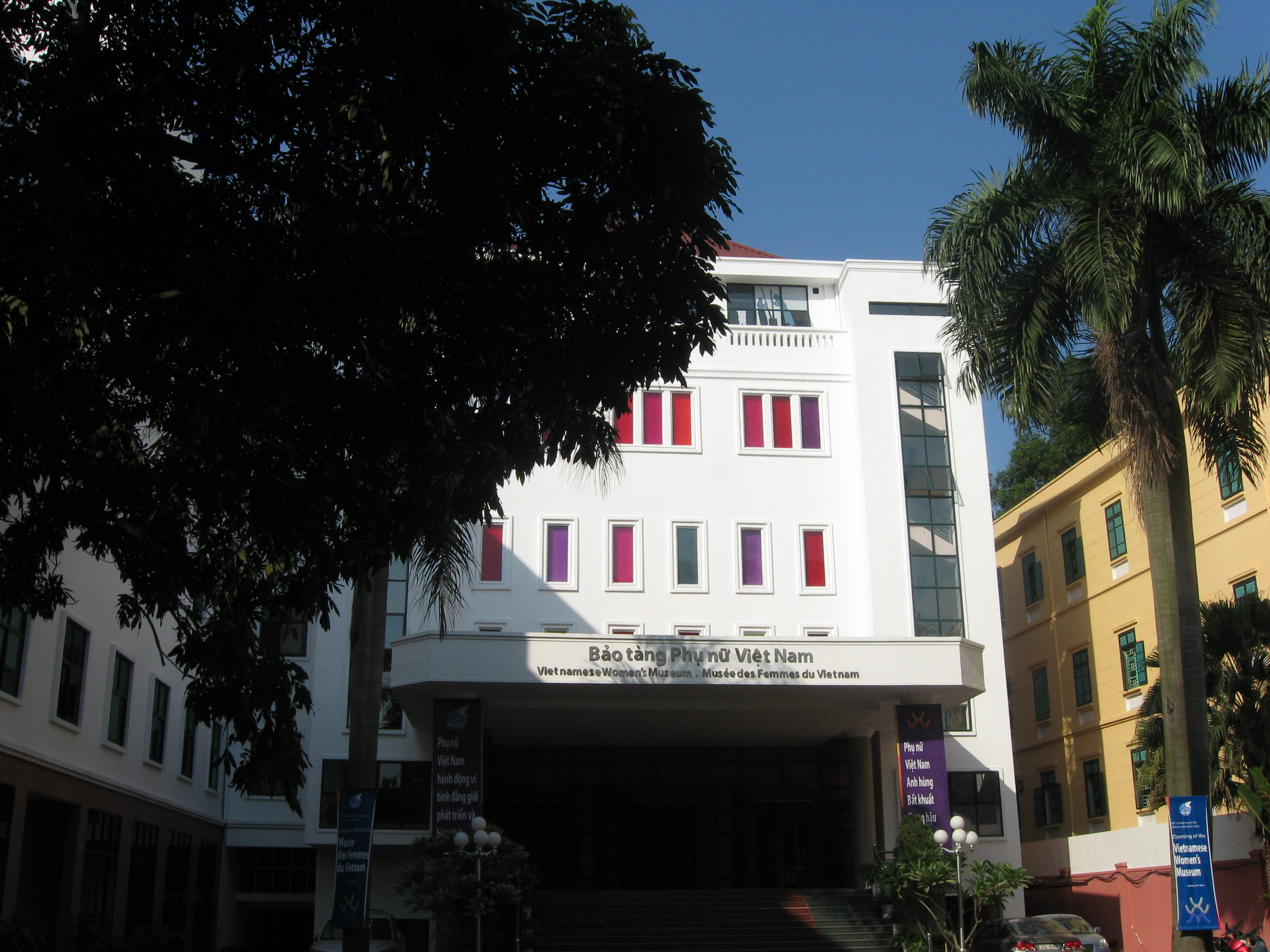
The entrance to the Vietnam Women's Museum in Hà Nội, Việt Nam

Beginning in 1986, the VWU chose to change their national focus to the socio-economic development of women in the

National Revolution. The movements were entitled the "Mutual assistance among women in household economic development, thrift for national construction" campaign and the "women actively study, creatively work and nurture happy families" campaign. As evidenced by the titles, the VWU now focused on women's place in the household and family as opposed to revolutions and governance of the new nation. In 1987, at the 6th national congress, the VWU opened the Vietnam Women's museum to show a history of Vietnamese women in history, fashion, and family. Attached to the Hanoi VWU headquarters, the museum aims to expand local knowledge on the impact women have had to the advancement of Vietnamese society. There are three permanent venues on the premises depicting the evolution of the history of Vietnamese women in fashion, general history, family development.

=== 1992–1997 ===
During this period, the VWU re-positioned itself as a union for both women and children's rights beginning with new social movements, the “Women’s mutual assistance for household economic development” and “Good parenting to reduce children’s malnutrition and school drop-outs” campaigns in 1992. These campaigns focused mainly on the development of women as heads of households in communities and trying to increase the national health and literacy percentages. These were mainly implemented through increased access to education at village levels, with budgeting classes and various informational activities designed to help women lead their household and take care of children in and out of poverty. During the 1990s, the VWU was relatively quiet in their work, with a focus on building internal infrastructure within the nation at both provincial and cadre levels.

=== 1997–2002 ===
The new social movements for the 8th national congress were "Women’s mutual assistance for household economic development and savings for national construction" expanding the VWU into grassroots campaigning through cadres. This new campaign aimed to provide education and training to women in poverty focused on handling household finances and maintaining childhood safety.

=== 2002–2007 ===
In 2007, the VWU received public notice from the late President Hồ Chí Minh, who announced that "The beautiful country of Vietnam has been built and woven by the women, both young and old, with their heartfelt efforts to become more wonderful". On the 65th anniversary of the founding of the Vietnam Women's Union, the VWU was awarded a curtain by the former Secretary General Đỗ Mười on behalf of the Party and the State reading "Vietnamese women are faithful, capable, talent and heroic." At The 10th National Congress in Hanoi, in October 2007, Party General Nông Đúc Mạnh presented a banner for “Vietnamese women, unity, creativeness, equality and development and contributing to national renovation in all fields”.

The goals of the 2007 mission statement were to increase the general knowledge and fiscal capacity of women in Vietnam and to improve both the material and spiritual lives of native women. The specific goal was to improve the quality and abilities of Vietnamese women, to cultivate them into women who were “patriotic, knowledgeable, healthy, skilful, dynamic, innovative, cultured, and kind-hearted.” In focusing on the growth of the union, the VWU's secondary goal was to develop the organizational ability of the VWU, planning “To build and develop an organizationally strong VWU” which could be a key role in motivating women's political and domestic participation. The other explicitly stated purpose of the WVU from 2002-2007 was to focus on protecting and developing women's legitimate rights and interests in Vietnam.

=== 2007–2012 ===
From 2008, the VWU chose to focus on “Studying and following President Hồ Chí Minh’s moral example” and ”Building affection houses” for their social and economic platforms, and specifically in the realm of women's rights chose to focus on gender equality in the workplace with the “Women and men work together as equals to share the work in building the family of 5 Without-s and 3 Clean-s” campaign. These include, building model roads and streets, creating green spaces for communities, gathering to clean public streets and areas, "voluntary Saturdays" for volunteer work and green organizations, and the promotion of women lowering the birth rate and families not having a third child. For women in grassroots areas and in response to the criticisms of unfair standards promoted in their ideal of socialist Vietnamese women, the VWU also began a social program in hopes to have women nurture their “self-confidence, self-respect, kind-heartedness and resourcefulness.” The empirical goals of this leadership were to increase participation to 80% in the Women study actively, work creatively and nurture happy families Movement, over 70% information access to non-VWU members about the Party's goals and directives, more than 60% of mothers under 16 having access to family support, and 70% of women using VWU resources reducing familial poverty and working to eliminate childhood hunger. The final goal of these five years was to increase the union's membership and local funding with over 90% of households having at least one VWU member.

=== 2012–2017 ===
From 2012, the VWU has increased focus on the plight of Vietnamese women and children who have been or may be victims of human trafficking. By setting up safe houses and increasing available information for the public, the VWU has begun training the most vulnerable in their country to protect themselves from individuals and organizations that may be dangerous. There has also been national safe house construction for women and children who are victims of domestic abuse, highlighting the VWU's focus on creating policy to protect women and children from domestic abuse and financial dependency during this term. The results of this five-year plan will be made available later in 2018 with the announcement of the next five year planning sequence.

=== 2017–present ===
The 12th Congress decided to further launch the emulation movement “Women study actively, work creatively and build happy families” and two campaigns “Women refine the qualities of self-confidence, self-respect, kind-heartedness and resourcefulness” and “Building the family of 5 Without-s and 3 Clean-s” during the 2017-2022 term. The VWU's focuses, broadly, for this term are on improving the efficiency of supervising law implementation that help address essential issues of women and improving the quality of the VWU’s performance at grassroots level and their involvement within the core of the VWU.
