= John P. Wheeler III =

American businessman and former White House aide (1944–2010)

Jack Wheeler
- Wheeler in the military
- Born: John Parsons Wheeler III; December 14, 1944; Laredo, Texas, U.S.
- Died: c. December 30, 2010 (aged 66); Delaware, U.S.
- Cause of death: Homicide
- Body discovered: Cherry Island Landfill, Wilmington, Delaware
- Resting place: Arlington National Cemetery
- Education: United States Military Academy; Harvard Business School; Yale Law School
- Employer: Mitre Corp.
- Spouse(s): Elisa Wheeler (divorced); Katherine Klyce
- Children: 2

John Parsons Wheeler III (December 14, 1944 – c. December 30, 2010), known as Jack Wheeler, was an American veteran, businessman, and activist, who held multiple positions in the U.S. government for five decades and helped create the Vietnam Veterans Memorial. He was murdered by an unknown person in or around Wilmington, Delaware in 2010.

In the 1960s, Wheeler served in a non-combat position in Vietnam during the Vietnam War, and worked for the Department of Defense as a staffer and systems analyst. In the 1970s, he was a senior planner for Amtrak, an official of the Securities and Exchange Commission, and a chairman of the Vietnam Veterans Memorial Fund. In the 1980s, he was the CEO of Mothers Against Drunk Driving, and an aide in the administrations of presidents Ronald Reagan and George H. W. Bush. In the 1990s, he was an activist for the deaf and for environmental concerns, and in the 2000s, he aided in the administration of president George W. Bush, and consulted for the Mitre Corporation.

Wheeler had homes in New Castle, Delaware; and New York City. On December 28, 2010, a man matching his description threw smoke bombs into a house neighboring Wheeler's in New Castle. Wheeler was last seen alive in Wilmington on December 30; he was acting unusually, though this may have resulted from his bipolar disorder. On the 31st, his corpse was found being dumped from a garbage truck into a nearby landfill. The truck had received its contents from a commercial trash bin in Newark, Delaware, earlier that day. Police labeled the death a homicide, but it is unknown whether it was politically motivated.

== Early life ==
Wheeler was descended from a family of military professionals including Joseph Wheeler, who had served as a general both in the Confederate Army, and later with the United States Army. Wheeler III was born in Laredo, Texas, where his mother, Janet Conly Wheeler, was staying with her mother while his father was in Europe. Five days after his birth, the family received a telegram that his father was missing in action in the Battle of the Bulge. His father was later found to be alive. Wheeler had one younger brother, Robert Conly Wheeler, and one younger sister, Janet Wheeler Gilani.

== Military career ==
Wheeler was a member of the United States Military Academy (West Point) class of 1966 which lost 30 of its members in the Vietnam War.

After graduation from West Point, he was a fire control platoon leader at a MIM-14 Nike-Hercules base at Franklin Lakes, New Jersey from 1966 to 1967. From 1967 to 1969, he was a graduate student at Harvard Business School spending the summer of 1968 as a systems analyst for the Office of Secretary of Defense in Washington, D.C. From 1969 to 1970, he served in a non-combat position at Long Binh in Vietnam. From 1970 to 1971, he served on the General Staff at the Pentagon.

Wheeler's West Point and later years are featured prominently in Rick Atkinson's book, The Long Gray Line: The American Journey of West Point's Class of 1966.

== Law career ==
After leaving the military he was a senior planner for Amtrak in 1971 and 1972. From 1972 to 1975 he attended law school at Yale University becoming a clerk for George E. MacKinnon in 1975–76 and an associate for Shea & Gardner in 1976–1978. From 1978 to 1986, he was assistant general counsel, special counsel to the chairman, and the secretary of the Securities and Exchange Commission.

== Vietnam Veterans Memorial ==
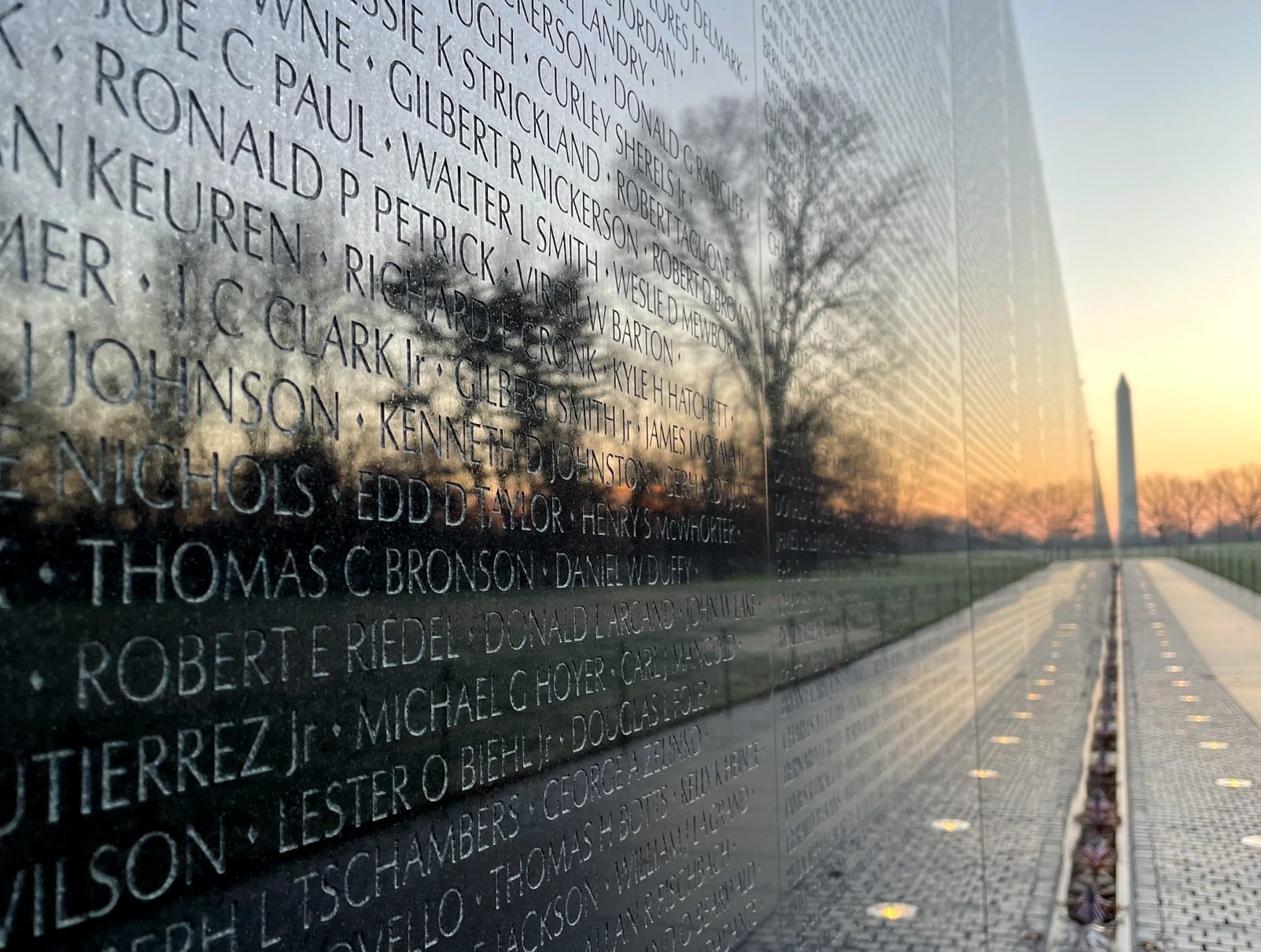
A section of the Vietnam Veterans Memorial

From 1979 to 1989, Wheeler was chairman of Vietnam Veterans Memorial Fund which built the Vietnam Veterans Memorial, opening in 1982. Working with Jan Scruggs, Robert W. Doubek and Sandie Fauriol, he supported the controversial Maya Lin design, which was opposed by Ross Perot and Jim Webb, who both tried to oust him as chairman of the memorial. Wheeler worked to address their issues by adding The Three Soldiers sculpture by Frederick Hart to the memorial.

In 1983, Carlton Sherwood ran a four-part series on WDVM-TV (now WUSA) "Vietnam Memorial: A Broken Promise?" which focused on Wheeler's handling of the Memorial Fund, claiming that most of the $9 million raised for the memorial was improperly accounted for. Sherwood cast aspersions on Wheeler's career, questioning his decision not to go directly to Vietnam out of West Point and noting he had been disciplined shortly after arriving there in 1969 for "misappropriation" of government property. A General Accounting Office audit spurred by the television report cleared Wheeler. WDVM officials made an on-air apology and donated $50,000 to the memorial.

In 1984, Wheeler published a memoir, Touched with Fire: The Future of the Vietnam Generation. He later founded the Project on the Vietnam Generation, an initiative based at the National Museum of American History that supported teaching and research on the Vietnam era and its social and cultural impact; its director of research was Stephen Sonnenberg.

In the 1988 television film To Heal a Nation about the construction of the Vietnam Memorial, Wheeler was played by Marshall Colt, four years his junior and the former co-star with James Arness in the crime drama McClain's Law. Eric Roberts portrayed Jan Scruggs; Glynnis O'Connor, Becky Scruggs', Jan's wife.

== Other service ==
In 1988–1989, Wheeler worked with President George H. W. Bush to establish the Earth Conservation Corps. From 1997 to 2001, he was president and CEO of the Deafness Research Foundation. He was consultant to acting Under Secretary of Defense for Acquisition, Technology, and Logistics from 2001 to 2005, special assistant to the Secretary of the Air Force from 2005 to 2008. From 2008 to 2009, he was special assistant to the acting assistant Secretary of the Air Force for Installations, Logistics and Energy. From 1983 to 1987, he was chairman and CEO of Mothers Against Drunk Driving, and from 1993 until his death, he was the founding CEO of the Vietnam Children's Fund.

== Family ==
Wheeler was twice married. He had two children from his first marriage, twins John Parsons Wheeler, IV, and Katherine Marie Wheeler. He met Katherine Klyce in 1993 and married her in 1997. They had two stepdaughters together, Byrd Schas Chaskes and Meriwether Klyce Schas. His younger brother Robert predeceased him. In 1995, Klyce's sister was murdered, and the case was solved years later.

== Murder ==
=== Background ===
Discussion over Wheeler's death—likely in Delaware—on December 30, 2010, is complicated by his diagnosis of bipolar disorder, which may explain his unusual actions in the preceding days. He was prone to "quirky habits and forgetfulness", and was hospitalized for a manic phase in 2004. He acted disoriented, in what could be a psychotic episode caused by "heart problems, stroke, stress, past mental illness, or a problem with medication." Authorities have labeled his death a homicide, though it is unknown if he was killed spontaneously by a stranger, or if he was the target of a political assassination. Wheeler was 66 at the time.

Wheeler had homes in New Castle, Delaware; and Harlem in New York City. Around December 24, Wheeler left the New Castle home to spend time with family at the Harlem home on Christmas. Wheeler's New Castle neighbor, Ron Roark, claimed that between the 24th and 31st, he (Roark) and his family heard, from outside the Wheelers' home, a loud television inside that was constantly on, though no one appeared to be home. Klyce said that Wheeler did not seem to have emotional problems during their stay in New York. They were scheduled to attend a wedding in Boston at some point after the 30th. The two talked for the last time on the 27th. On the morning of the 28th, Wheeler left as Klyce was sleeping. He had previously told her he was going to Washington, D.C. to give gifts to a few people, probably spending time with his political acquaintances. She did not contact him after he left, as she expected him to return within a few days for the wedding. He had lunch at the Metropolitan Cafe in downtown D.C. On the 28th, Wheeler was scheduled to take an Amtrak train from D.C. to Wilmington, and police are unsure if he ever got on this train.

=== Strange behavior and occurrences ===
==== December 28 and 29 ====
On the 28th, in New Castle, a man matching Wheeler's description threw smoke bombs "typically used to exterminate rodents" into a house under construction across the street from his house. For the last three years, Wheeler had filed lawsuits challenging the zoning approval for the house in a lawsuit, because the building blocked the Wheelers' view of the Delaware River. Police questioned if this was an attempt at arson on the house by Wheeler. According to a Philadelphia TV station and the Radio Times, Wheeler's phone was found inside the new house in January 2011, though police would not confirm this. The last email from Wheeler to his family was sent on the morning of the 29th, from a different phone than Wheeler's usual device.

Wheeler was sighted on the 29th in Delaware, at the New Castle County courthouse parking garage. He was disoriented and wearing only one shoe, as the other was ripped. While he attempted to gain access to the parking garage on foot, Wheeler claimed that he wanted to warm up before paying a parking fee (police later determined that his car was actually in a different parking garage at the train station, blocks away). Wheeler explained to the parking garage attendant that his briefcase had been stolen and assured her he was not intoxicated. He was also going up and down the garage stairs in a manner that, Klyce said, suggests he was being cautious. The parking lot attendant said he "knew something wasn't right" with Wheeler. At 6 p.m., Wheeler asked his pharmacist in New Castle for a ride to the Wilmington train station. He "looked upset". The pharmacist offered to call a cab for him, at which point Wheeler left the store.

==== December 30 ====
Friends began to suspect something was wrong with Wheeler on the 30th, when he unusually did not send them emails—especially after an Army football team won a bowl game that day, which would have been of interest to Wheeler. Early on the 30th, Wheeler's New Castle house was found to be in disorder. Various items were moved or tipped over, but nothing seemed to be stolen. At 8 a.m. that day, Wheeler bought a coffee from a Subway on Delaware Avenue in Wilmington. He paid using cash that was loose in his pocket. The owner of the store took note of his clothes, which were dirty, and did not include a coat for the cold temperature that morning. Wheeler then visited a nearby law office, and when he left, he was captured by a security camera. On the video, it looks like he is trying to hide his face.

At 3:30 p.m., Wheeler walked into a nearby Small Business Administration office, and asked for a ride to Philadelphia. Klyce said he potentially wanted to go to Philadelphia to get a train to go back to New York City. The office's administrator would not describe Wheeler's conversation with her there. However, a different employee of the office described her own conversation with Wheeler, saying that Wheeler referred to himself as a "fellow federal employee"; she asked which agency he was in, but he did not answer, and left. Some sources say that Wheeler was last seen alive at 8:30 to 9 p.m. on a surveillance video in downtown Wilmington, and it is not known where he spent the night. One source says that a man claimed to have taken a taxi from Wilmington to Newark, Delaware with Wheeler, at 11 p.m.

=== Discovery of Wheeler's body and aftermath ===
On December 31, Wheeler's body was seen by a landfill worker as it fell onto a trash heap in the Cherry Island Landfill in Wilmington, Delaware. Police later claimed that "all the stops made Friday (December 31) by the garbage truck before it arrived at the landfill involved large commercial disposal bins in Newark". The truck started its route before 4:30 a.m. and arrived at the landfill at 10 a.m., "after making 10 stops at a variety of businesses, including a public library, a seniors' complex, and a car dealership", locations which were mostly covered by cameras. Based on Wheeler's position in the truck, the dumpster he was in was likely picked up towards the start of the route.

Police do not know if Wheeler was killed in Wilmington or elsewhere. The investigation was led by Newark police, assisted by Wilmington police and the FBI. Police gave Klyce conflicting information as to whether or not he had a heart attack before he died. She said it was unlikely he was robbed, as his body was found wearing his Rolex watch and West Point class ring. She also said that he made "lots of enemies" during his career in national defense, though there was nobody who wanted to kill him. She and her family offered a $25,000 reward for information about his death.

On January 28, 2011, the Delaware state medical examiner's office reported Wheeler's cause of death as assault and blunt force trauma, without elaboration. He was assaulted at least from the neck on up (which is all that was shown to Klyce). His remains were interred at Arlington National Cemetery with full military honors on April 29.

== Legacy ==
In late 2011, Klyce's brother, Henry, and wife Carole filed a lawsuit that claimed Wheeler, Klyce, and Klyce's sister were harassing their family (Klyce and Carole's) – including hacking their computers – in an attempt to "persuade Henry Klyce to allow his sisters to invest in his business ventures in medical devices"; the sisters had already made millions from investments in the ventures in the past, but were cut off by Henry after a "family feud" over financial difficulties. Klyce and her sister referred to the accusations as "fanciful and unsupportable allegations". The lawsuit ended with a settlement in which no sides acknowledged they were liable.

The Securities and Exchange Commission has an award named after Wheeler, given annually to those who have significantly benefitted U.S. service members and veterans' lives.

== See also ==
- List of unsolved murders (2000–present)

== Bibliography ==
- Wheeler, John (January 1982). "Theological Reflections upon the Vietnam War" (PDF). Anglican Theological Review. 64 (1): 1–14.
- Wheeler, John (1984). Touched with Fire: The Future of the Vietnam Generation. New York: Watts. ISBN 0-531-09832-X. OCLC 10207966.
- Wheeler, John (1998). "Editorial" (PDF). American Journal of Otology. 19 (1): 1–3.
