= Chad Oliver =

American novelist

- Chad Oliver c, 1953
- Born: March 30, 1928; Cincinnati, Ohio
- Died: August 9, 1993 (age 65); Austin, Texas
- Occupations: Writer; anthropologist; professor
- Writing career
- Period: 1940s–1980s
- Genres: Science fiction, Western

Symmes Chadwick Oliver (March 30, 1928 – August 9, 1993) was an American anthropologist and science fiction and Western writer.

Oliver was born in Cincinnati, Ohio, to Symmes Francis Oliver and Winona Neuman Oliver. His family moved to Crystal City, Texas, in 1943, where his father worked as a surgeon and medical officer at a detention camp. His mother was a nurse. Oliver suffered a severe attack of rheumatic fever at age twelve and was bedridden for several months, during which he became interested in science fiction.

He spent most of his life in Austin, Texas where he was twice chairman of the department of anthropology of the University of Texas. He was also one of the founders of the Turkey City Writer's Workshop. He first attended the university in 1946 as a student and, apart from a brief sojourn to UCLA to obtain his Ph.D., he remained there in some capacity until his death, 47 years later.

He first had a story published in 1950. His science fiction is generally classified as anthropological science fiction because he often used insights from his professional work to inform his fictional writing.

His fiction often reflected his anthropology background. His books referenced Native American life, the outdoors, the American Southwest, and relationships between people and land. Commenting on the connection, he said:

"I like to think that there's a kind of feedback ... that the kind of open-minded perspective in science fiction conceivably has made me a better anthropologist. And on the other side of the coin, the kind of rigor that anthropology has, conceivably has made me a better science fiction writer."

An avid fly fisherman, Professor Oliver supported the Guadalupe River Chapter of Trout Unlimited and the cold water fishery downstream from Canyon Dam. Numerous scenes in his writings made reference to actions and experiences related to fishing in moving water (e.g. wading a river in "Shores of Another Sea").

== Academic career ==
Oliver studied at the University of Texas at Austin, earning a B.A. with honors in 1951 and an M.A. in English and anthropology in 1952. His master's thesis, They Builded a Tower, was an early academic study of science fiction and may have been among the first graduate works to focus on magazine science fiction.

He earned a doctorate in anthropology at the University of California, Los Angeles in 1961. His dissertation was published as Ecology and Cultural Continuity as Contributing Factors in the Social Organization of the Plains Indians in 1962. Oliver returned to the University of Texas at Austin, where he taught anthropology and later served as chair of the department.

== Teaching award ==
The Chad Oliver Teaching Award is given each year by the Plan II Honors Program at the University of Texas at Austin for outstanding teaching and service to the program. The award began in 1990 as the Plan II Teaching Award, when it was presented to Oliver on his retirement. Plan II students later voted to rename it in his honor.

The recipient is chosen by vote of the Plan II student body and announced at the spring Plan II Honors commencement ceremony.

Among the recipients have been philosophers Robert C. Solomon and Paul Woodruff, classicist Thomas G. Palaima, and psychiatrist Stephen Sonnenberg, who received the award in 2026.

== Bibliography ==
=== Novels ===
- Mists of Dawn (1952)
- Shadows in the Sun (1954)
- The Winds of Time (1957)
- Unearthly Neighbors (1960, revised in 1984)
- The Wolf is My Brother (1967)
- The Shores of Another Sea (1971)
- Giants in the Dust (1976)
- Broken Eagle (1989)
- The Cannibal Owl (1994)

=== Collections ===
- Another Kind (1955)
- The Edge of Forever (1971)
- A Star Above It and Other Stories (2003)
- Far from This Earth and Other Stories (2003)

=== Selected short fiction ===
- "Transfusion" (1959)
- "Blood's a Rover" in Robert Silverberg (ed), Deep Space, 1976. Not to be confused with a proposed novel of the same title by Harlan Ellison.
- "The Shore of Tomorrow", novelette in Startling Stories March, 1953
