= Robert M. Lawrence =

American architect (1930–2011)

- Born: Robert Martin Lawrence; August 22, 1930; Oklahoma City
- Died: February 21, 2011 (aged 80); Oklahoma City
- Occupation: Architect
- Awards: School Medal, American Institute of Architects (1953); Fellow; American Institute of Architects (1975)

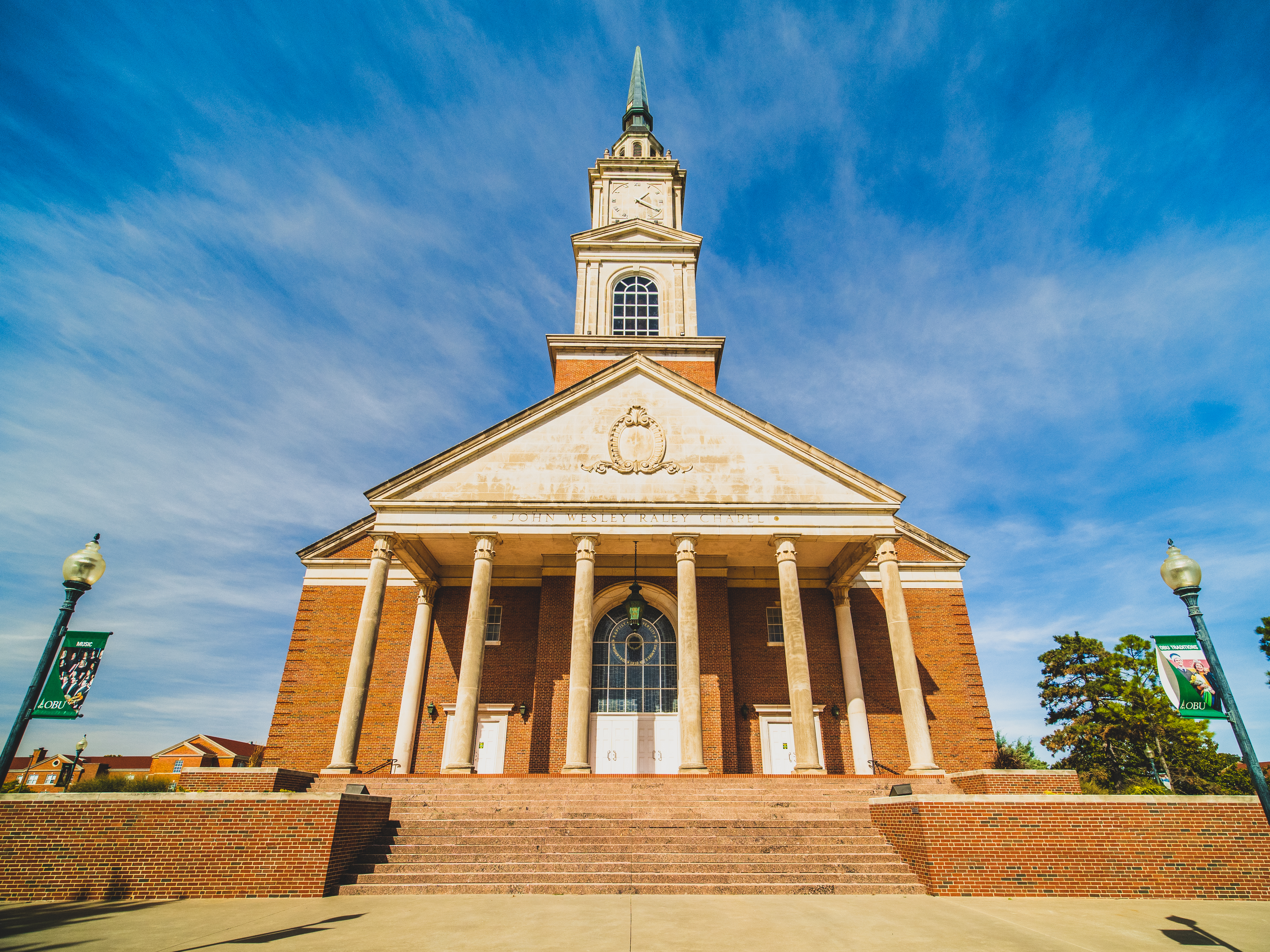
Raley Chapel of Oklahoma Baptist University, completed in 1961.

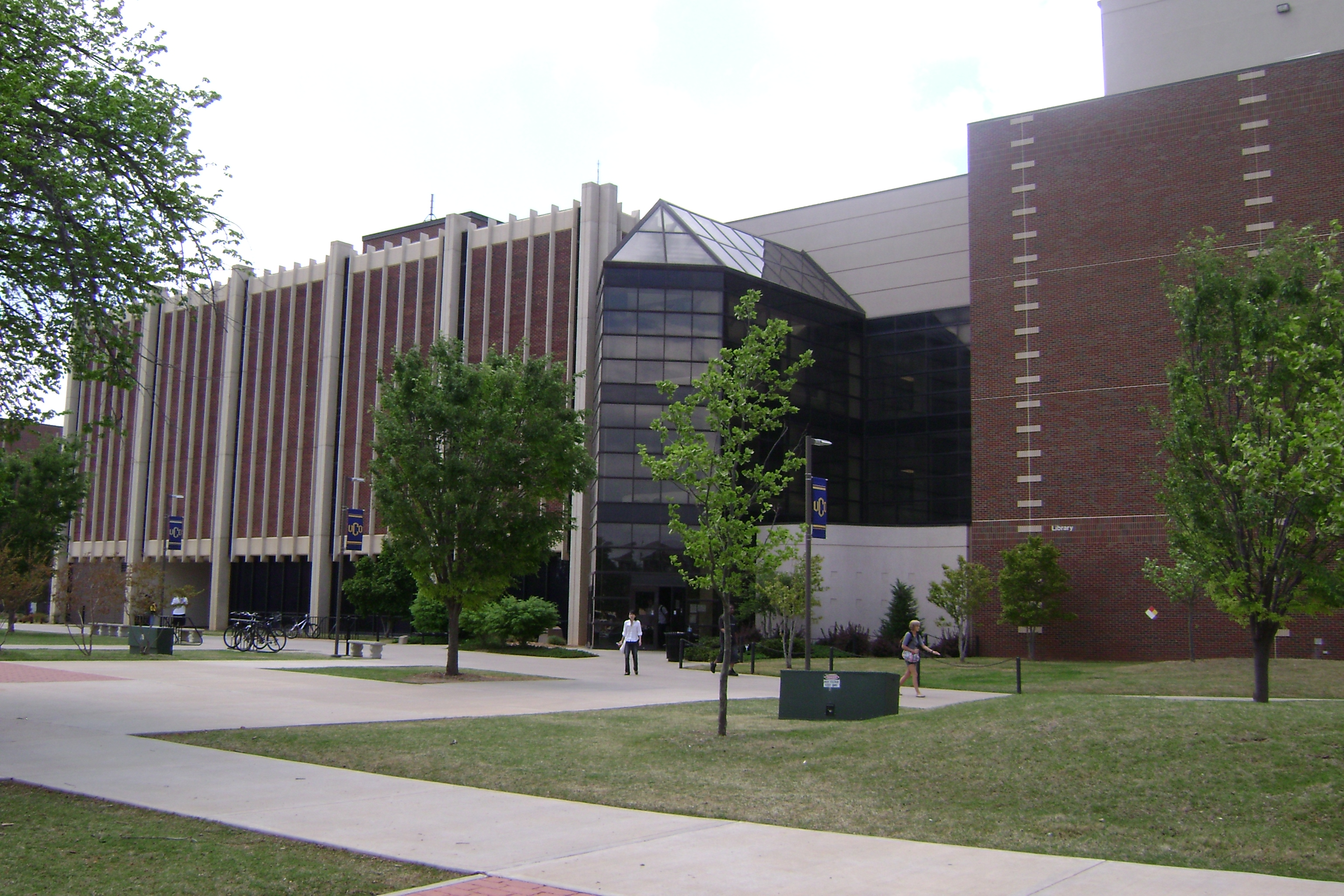
The Chambers Library at the University of Central Oklahoma, completed in 1969.

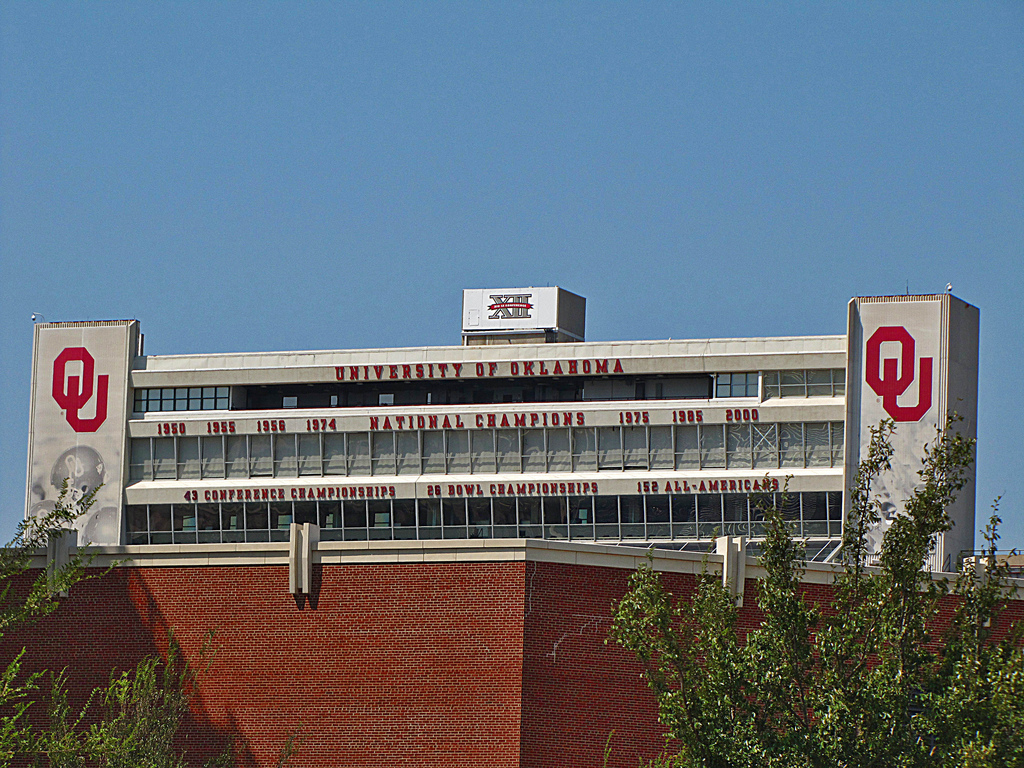
The press box addition to the Gaylord Family Oklahoma Memorial Stadium, completed in 1975.

Robert Martin Lawrence, FAIA (August 22, 1930 – February 21, 2011) was an American architect, in practice in Oklahoma City. He was president of the American Institute of Architects for the year 1982.

== Life and career ==
Robert Martin Lawrence was born August 22, 1930, in Oklahoma City, to William "Martin" Lawrence, an architect.

He was educated in the Oklahoma City public schools, and Oklahoma State University (OSU). He graduated with a BArch in 1953, and was awarded a School Medal from the American Institute of Architects (AIA).

He then returned to Oklahoma City where he joined architects Noftsger & Lawrence, where his father was a partner. His father's partner, B. Gaylord Noftsger, had previously been responsible for the Fort Worth Public Market, completed in 1930. The firm became Noftsger, Lawrence & Associates in 1958 and then Noftsger, Lawrence, Lawrence & Flesher in 1963 when Lawrence and another associate, Thomas H. Flesher Jr., became full partners. Noftsger died in 1979, followed by the elder Lawrence in 1982. The surviving partners continued the firm as Lawrence & Flesher until 1987, and thereafter by Lawrence alone as Robert M. Lawrence & Associates. In 1985 Lawrence & Flesher's upper school of the Heritage Hall School (1984), was recipient of an honor award from the Oklahoma chapter of the AIA and a Solomon Andrew Layton Award for masonry design from the Oklahoma Masonry Institute.

Lawrence joined the American Institute of Architects (AIA) in 1957 as a member of the Oklahoma chapter. He served in several chapter offices, including president in 1970. He was elected to the AIA board of directors in 1973 and was elected to two terms as secretary, serving from 1977 to 1981. In 1980 he was elected first vice president/president elect for 1981 and president for 1982. As president Lawrence led the AIA's defense of Maya Lin's design for the Vietnam Veterans Memorial as conservatives argued that the design was "too lacking in the symbols of heroism that more conventional monuments contain" and pushed for the inclusion of such symbols. Lawrence lobbied the United States Commission of Fine Arts (CFA), which had final say over the design, to reject any changes to Lin's design. Ultimately a compromise was struck and the heroic elements, which had materialized as Frederick Hart's Three Soldiers statue and a flagpole, were sited in a position subsidiary to the memorial rather than as the main focus.

In 1983 Lawrence was appointed to the National Architectural Accrediting Board and was its president for 1986–87. He was elected a fellow of the AIA in 1975 and was elected to honorary membership in the Royal Architectural Institute of Canada (RAIC) and the Federation of Colleges of Architects of the Mexican Republic (FCARM).

== Personal life ==
Lawrence was married in 1951 to Joanne Holcombe, a high school and OSU classmate. They had two children. Lawrence died February 21, 2011, at the age of 80.

== Architectural works ==
=== Noftsger, Lawrence & Associates, 1958–1963 ===
- Caddo County Courthouse, 110 SW 2nd St, Anadarko, Oklahoma (1959)
- First Baptist Church, 702 N 3rd St, Stratford, Texas (1959)
- Fairview Regional Medical Center, 523 E State Rd, Fairview, Oklahoma (1960)
- Kingfisher County Courthouse, 101 S Main St, Kingfisher, Oklahoma (1960)
- Raley Chapel, Oklahoma Baptist University, Shawnee, Oklahoma (1961)

=== Noftsger, Lawrence, Lawrence & Flesher, 1963–1979 ===
- Nigh University Center, University of Central Oklahoma, Edmond, Oklahoma (1967)
- Art and Design Building, University of Central Oklahoma, Edmond, Oklahoma (1969)
- Chambers Library, University of Central Oklahoma, Edmond, Oklahoma (1969)
- First Baptist Church, 218 S 6th St, Ponca City, Oklahoma (1969)
- Gaylord Family Oklahoma Memorial Stadium west side additions, University of Oklahoma, Norman, Oklahoma (1975)
- 101 Park Avenue Building, 101 Park Ave, Oklahoma City (1976)

=== Lawrence, Lawrence & Flesher, 1979–1982 ===
- Gaylord Family Oklahoma Memorial Stadium south end zone additions, University of Oklahoma, Norman, Oklahoma (1980, demolished 2015)

=== Lawrence & Flesher, 1982–1987 ===
- Heritage Hall School upper school, 1800 NW 122nd St, Oklahoma City (1984)
