= Robert Lawrence =

Robert Lawrence may refer to:

- Robert Lawrence (British Army officer) (born 1960)
- Robert Lawrence (golf course architect) (1893–1976), golf course architect
- Robert Lawrence (martyr) (died 1535), English saint
- Robert Lawrence (MP), Member of Parliament (MP) for Lancashire
- Robert Lawrence (film editor) (1913–2004), Oscar-nominated film editor on Spartacus
- Robert Daniel Lawrence (1892–1968), British physician
- Robert Henry Lawrence Jr. (1935–1967), American astronaut
- Robert M. Lawrence (1930–2011), American architect, president of the American Institute of Architects for 1982
- Robert Means Lawrence, (1847-1935), American physician and writer
- Robert Morgan Lawrence, sex educator with the Center for Sex & Culture
- Robert William Lawrence (1807–1833), botanist
- Robert Z. Lawrence (born 1949), Harvard professor
- R. L. Stine (Robert Lawrence Stine, born 1943), American novelist
- Robert Lawrence (producer) (born 1953), American film producer and studio executive
- Robert L. Lawrence (1919–2004), American television and film producer
- Bob Lawrence (1899–1983), baseball player
- Larry Lawrence (gridiron football) (1949–2012), American football quarterback
- "Bob Lawrence", a joint pseudonym used by Bob Oksner and Larry Nadle on the "I Love Lucy" comic strip

== See also ==
- Robert St Lawrence, 3rd Baron Howth (c. 1435 – bef. 1488), Lord Chancellor of Ireland
