= Stephen Sonnenberg =

Professor of psychiatry

Stephen M. Sonnenberg
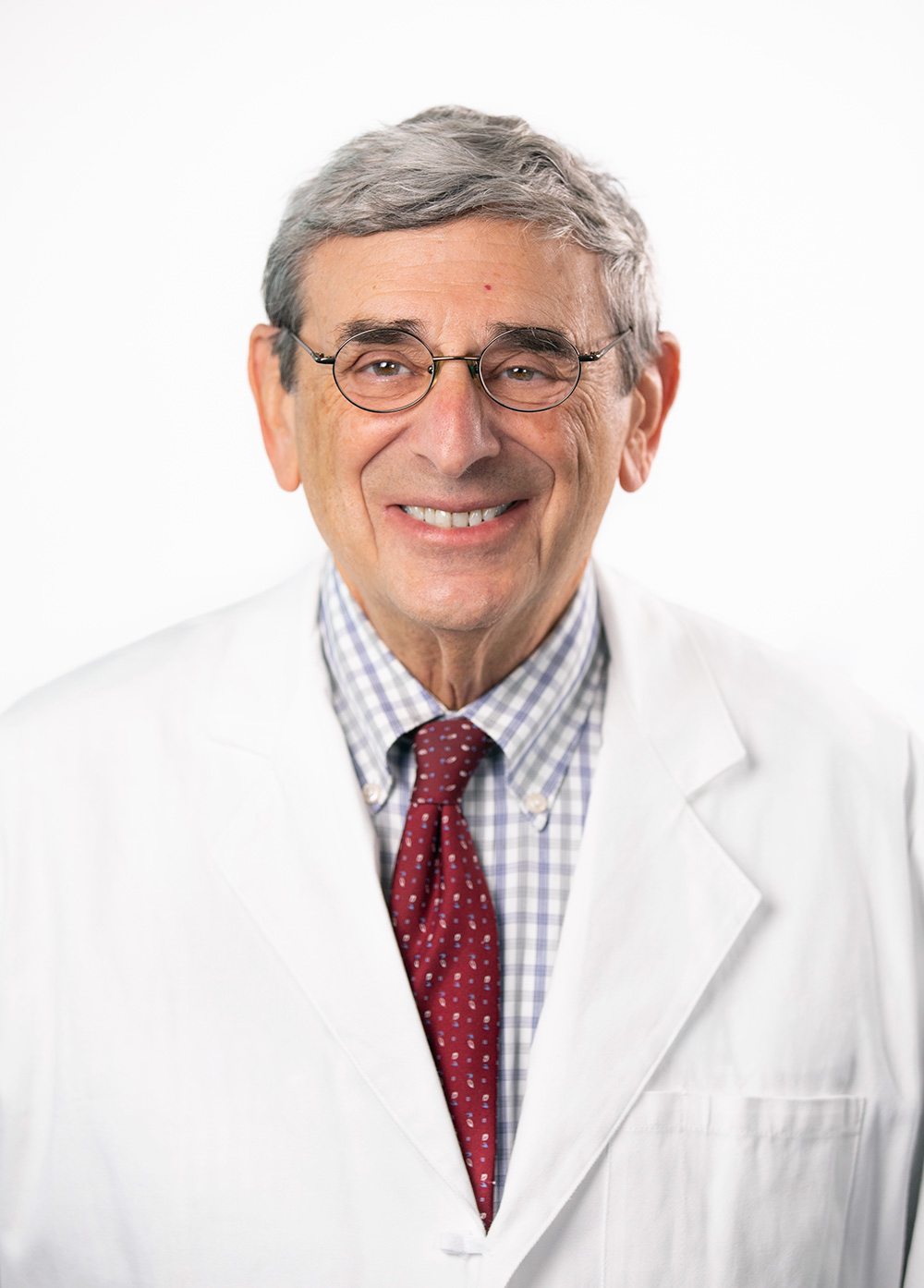
- Sonnenberg in 2023
- Born: March 22, 1940; Brooklyn, New York, U.S.
- Education: Princeton University (AB); Albert Einstein College of Medicine (MD)
- Known for: Medical humanities education; war trauma and PTSD research
- Scientific career
- Fields: Psychiatry; psychoanalysis; medical humanities
- Institutions: University of Texas at Austin; Baylor College of Medicine; George Washington University; Uniformed Services University

Stephen Sonnenberg (born March 22, 1940, in Brooklyn, New York) is an American psychiatrist, psychoanalyst, and educator at the University of Texas at Austin, where he is a professor at the Dell Medical School and holds the Paul B. Woodruff Professorship for Excellence in Undergraduate Studies. His work focuses on medical education and the psychological effects of war and violence, including post-traumatic stress disorder, and has included clinical research, teaching in the medical humanities, and testimony before the United States Senate Committee on Veterans' Affairs. He is a Distinguished Life Fellow of the American Psychiatric Association.

== Early life and education ==
Educated at Princeton University and the Albert Einstein College of Medicine, Sonnenberg trained in internal medicine and psychiatry, worked as a researcher at the National Institute of Mental Health, and later completed psychoanalytic training at the Baltimore–Washington Institute for Psychoanalysis.

== Career ==
He has practiced medicine since 1965 and has taught medical humanities and ethics at the University of Texas at Austin since 2012. His work centers on medical education and the psychological effects of war and violence, particularly post-traumatic stress disorder (PTSD), which he examined in both clinical and theoretical terms, with attention to its impact on behavior, identity, and ethical experience. He testified on these issues before the United States Senate Committee on Veterans' Affairs in 1981 and 1988, and co-edited The Trauma of War: Stress and Recovery in Viet Nam Veterans (1985). His work on war and trauma developed during a period of expanding academic interest in the Vietnam War.

He later served as director of research for the Project on the Vietnam Generation, where he helped shape its research agenda and academic programs. The project, founded by Vietnam veteran John Wheeler and based at the National Museum of American History, examined the psychological and social impact of the Vietnam era on those who came of age during the period, which Sonnenberg described as a generation shaped by both conflict and its aftermath.

In the 1980s, his work focused on psychiatry’s public role and on the psychological aspects of war, politics, and conflict. He was quoted in The New York Times in 1982 as the director of the Washington School of Psychiatry, noting a decline in psychiatric training. He was later quoted in Newsweek in 1988 as the head of the American Psychoanalytic Association’s public affairs committee and a practicing analyst in Washington, D.C., in connection with professional outreach efforts in psychoanalysis. In 1985, he chaired a session on "The psychology of nuclear deterrence and national behavior" at a meeting of the International Society of Political Psychology, alongside colleagues from the Carnegie Endowment’s Psychology of Deterrence Project, reflecting his work at the Washington School of Psychiatry.

In 2017, the National Endowment for the Humanities awarded Sonnenberg a grant to develop the undergraduate medical humanities program Patients, Practitioners, and Cultures of Care (PPCC) at the University of Texas at Austin. He has served as chair of the program’s faculty panel. In 2024, a $2 million endowment from the Bratcher family expanded and renamed the program in honor of Joe W. Bratcher III. This endowment supported growth in undergraduate medical humanities education.

He has appeared on the University of Texas podcast This Is Democracy, hosted by Jeremi Suri, discussing topics including mental health, public policy, and the COVID-19 pandemic.

== Honors and recognition ==
Sonnenberg received the Chad Oliver Teaching Award from the Plan II Honors Program at the University of Texas at Austin in 2026. The award, first presented in 1990 and named for Plan II alumnus and professor Chad Oliver, is given annually to a faculty member chosen by vote of the Plan II student body for excellence in teaching and dedication to the program.

== Books ==
- Sonnenberg, Stephen M., Blank, Arthur S, and Talbott, John A. The Trauma of War: Stress and Recovery in Viet Nam Veterans. Washington, D.C.: American Psychiatric Press, 1985. ISBN 9780880480482
- Ursano, Robert J., Sonnenberg, Stephen M., and Lazar, Susan G. Concise Guide to Psychodynamic Psychotherapy: Principles and Techniques of Brief, Intermittent, and Long-Term Psychodynamic Psychotherapy. American Psychiatric Publishing Inc, 2004 ISBN 9781281396082
