= Vietnam Veterans Memorial Fund =

American nonprofit organization

The Vietnam Veterans Memorial Fund is dedicated to remembering those who served in the USA armed forces in Vietnam and to maintaining the Vietnam Veterans Memorial in Washington D.C.

The Vietnam Veterans Memorial Fund, Inc. (VVMF), is the non-profit organization established on April 27, 1979, by Jan Scruggs, a former Army Infantry in Vietnam. Others veterans joined including, Jack Wheeler, and several other graduates of West Point to finance the construction of a memorial to those Americans who served or died during the Vietnam War. The memorial was not designed to make a political statement about the war itself. From this fund came the Vietnam Veterans Memorial, dedicated on Veterans Day, 1982, on the National Mall in Washington, D.C.

== History ==
The Memorial was established by the Vietnam Veterans Memorial Fund, Inc. (VVMF), the nonprofit organization incorporated on April 27, 1979. By the time of the memorial's 1982 dedication, VVMF's leadership included Jan C. Scruggs as president, Robert A. Carter as executive vice president, Robert W. Doubek as project director, and Sandie Fauriol as director of the National Salute to Vietnam Veterans.

VVMF wanted Vietnam veterans to have a tangible symbol of recognition from the American people. By separating the issue of the service of the individual men and women from the issue of U.S. policy in Vietnam, VVMF hoped to begin a process of national reconciliation. The vision of a Memorial of names flowed from the academic work at American University of Jan Scruggs about which he testified to the US Senate. The hope was that the Memorial of names would help surviving veterans and the nation to recover from the Vietnam War.

Significant initial support came from U.S. Senators Charles McC. Mathias, Jr., (R-Md.) and John W. Warner (R-Va.). On November 8, 1979, Sen. Mathias introduced legislation to authorize a site of national park land for the memorial. The first significant financial contributions to launch the national fundraising campaign were raised by Sen. Warner.

More than $8,000,000 was raised, all of which came from private sources. Corporations, foundations, unions, veterans groups and civic organizations contributed, but most importantly, more than 275,000 individual Americans donated the majority of the money needed to build the Memorial.

On July 1, 1980, Congress authorized a site of three acres in Constitution Gardens near the Lincoln Memorial. In October of that year, VVMF announced a national design competition open to any U.S. citizen over 18 years of age. By December 29, 1981, there were 2,573 registrants, and the competition became the largest of its kind ever held in the United States.

By the March 31, 1981, deadline, 1,421 design entries had been submitted. All entries were judged anonymously by a jury of eight internationally recognized artists and designers who had been selected by VVMF. On May 1, 1981, the jury presented its unanimous selection for first prize, which was accepted and adopted enthusiastically by VVMF.

The winning design was the work of Maya Ying Lin of Athens, Ohio, a 21-year-old senior at Yale University. In August 1981, VVMF selected a building company and architecture firm to develop the plans and build Lin's design. Lin became a design consultant to the architect of record.

In January 1982, the decision was made to add a flagstaff and sculpture on the Memorial site in order to provide a realistic depiction of three Vietnam service members and a symbol of their courage and devotion to their country. On March 11, 1982, the design and plans received final federal approval, and work at the site was begun on March 16, 1982. Ground was formally broken on Friday, March 26, 1982.

In July 1982, VVMF selected Washington, D.C. sculptor Frederick Hart to design the sculpture of the servicemen to be placed at the site. The U.S. Commission of Fine Arts finally unanimously accepted the proposed sculpture and flagstaff.

Construction at the site was completed in November 1982. The Memorial was dedicated on November 13, 1982. The Three Servicemen statue was added in 1984. That same year, the Memorial was given as a "gift" to the American people during a ceremony with President Ronald Reagan.

Several later initiatives, including the Project on the Vietnam Generation, grew out of networks formed around the memorial.

In 1993, the Vietnam Women's Memorial by sculptor Glenna Goodacre was added to the Memorial site to represent the heroic work of women who served in the Vietnam War.

In 2000, Congress authorized the placement on the Memorial site of a plaque honoring post-war casualties of Vietnam whose names are not eligible for inscription on The Wall. The In Memory plaque was dedicated in 2004 and reads: "In Memory of the men and women who served in the Vietnam War and later died as a result of their service. We honor and remember their sacrifice." VVMF worked with several organizations and architects to ensure that the plaque is harmonious with the site's other elements.

== Funding ==
The founders of the memorial set forth to collect several million dollars from private donors. In its first three years, the VVMF collected more than $8 million from more than 275,000 Americans. No government/federal funds were used to build the Memorial.

== Contest ==
In October 1980, the VVMF announced a contest for the design of the Vietnam Veterans Memorial would be open to anyone over 18 years of age. The contest was the largest of its kind ever held in the United States, with over 2,573 contestants, and was judged by eight professional artists and architects. The winner of the contest was Maya Ying Lin, who submitted the idea for a wall. The material would be highly reflective black granite.

== Design ==
The Vietnam Veterans Memorial Fund wanted, above all, for the memorial to have a prominent site in a large, park-like area; thus, the western end of Constitution Gardens was requested as the site. Subsequently, VVMF set four major criteria for the design: (1) that it be reflective and contemplative in character, (2) that it harmonize with its surroundings, especially the neighboring national memorials, (3) that it contain the names of all who died or remain missing, and (4) that it make no political statement about the war.

Maya Lin conceived her design as creating a park within a park — a quiet protected place unto itself, yet harmonious with the overall plan of Constitution Gardens. To achieve this effect she chose polished black granite for the walls. Its mirror-like surface reflects the images of the surrounding trees, lawns and monuments. The Memorial's walls point to the Washington Monument and Lincoln Memorial, thus bringing the Memorial into the historical context of our country. The names are inscribed in the chronological order of their dates of casualty, showing the war as a series of individual human sacrifices and giving each name a special place in history.

Statement by Maya Ying Lin, March, 1981 (presented as part of her competition submission)

"Walking through this park-like area, the memorial appears as a rift in the earth, a long, polished, black stone wall, emerging from and receding into the earth. Approaching the memorial, the ground slopes gently downward and the low walls emerging on either side, growing out of the earth, extend and converge at a point below and ahead. Walking into this grassy site contained by the walls of the memorial we can barely make out the carved names upon the memorial's walls. These names, seemingly infinite in number, convey the sense of overwhelming numbers, while unifying these individuals into a whole. "The memorial is composed not as an unchanging monument, but as a moving composition to be understood as we move into and out of it. The passage itself is gradual; the descent to the origin slow, but it is at the origin that the memorial is to be fully understood. At the intersection of these walls, on the right side, is carved the date of the first death. It is followed by the names of those who died in the war, in chronological order. These names continue on this wall appearing to recede into the earth at the wall's end. The names resume on the left wall as the wall emerges from the earth, continuing back to the origin where the date of the last death is carved at the bottom of this wall. Thus the war's beginning and end meet; the war is ‘complete,' coming full-circle, yet broken by the earth that bounds the angle's open side, and continued within the earth itself. As we turn to leave, we see these walls stretching into the distance, directing us to the Washington Monument, to the left, and the Lincoln Memorial, to the right, thus bringing the Vietnam Memorial into an historical context. We the living are brought to a concrete realization of these deaths.

"Brought to a sharp awareness of such a loss, it is up to each individual to resolve or come to terms with this loss. For death, is in the end a personal and private matter, and the area contained with this memorial is a quiet place, meant for personal reflection and private reckoning. The black granite walls, each two hundred feet long, and ten feet below ground at their lowest point (gradually ascending toward ground level) effectively act as a sound barrier, yet are of such a height and length so as not to appear threatening or enclosing. The actual area is wide and shallow, allowing for a sense of privacy, and the sunlight from the memorial's southern exposure along with the grassy park surrounding and within its walls, contribute to the serenity of the area. Thus this memorial is for those who have died, and for us to remember them.

"The memorial's origin is located approximately at the center of the site; its legs each extending two hundred feet towards the Washington Monument and the Lincoln Memorial. The walls, contained on one side by the earth, are ten feet below ground at their point of origin, gradually lessening in height, until they finally recede totally into the earth, at their ends. The walls are to be made of a hard, polished black granite, with the names to be carved in a simple Trojan letter. The memorial's construction involves recontouring the area within the wall's boundaries, so as to provide for an easily accessible descent, but as much of the site as possible should be left untouched. The area should remain as a park, for all to enjoy."

== Construction ==
The ground-breaking of the Vietnam Veterans Memorial in March 1982.

Construction of the Vietnam Veterans Memorial began on March 16, 1982, though the official ground-breaking was on Friday, March 26, 1982. The construction was finished in late October 1982. The memorial was formally dedicated on November 13, 1982. The Three Soldiers statue by Frederick Hart was added in 1984, and the Vietnam Women's Memorial was added in 1993. The In Memory plaque was added in 2004.

== Controversy ==
The various elements of the Vietnam Veterans Memorial site on the National Mall have been a subject of numerous controversies revolving around design issues. Probably no other major US memorial has been as controversial. This perhaps partially reflects the controversial nature of the war itself.

== Today ==
Today, VVMF continues to lead the way in paying tribute to our nation's Vietnam veterans and their families. VVMF's mission is to honor and preserve the legacy of service in America and educate all generations about the impact of the Vietnam War and era. VVMF partners with the National Park Service on the long-term care and preservation of the Memorial site. See WWW.VVMF.ORG

== The Wall That Heals ==
The Wall That Heals is a traveling exhibit that includes a three-quarter scale replica of the Vietnam Veterans Memorial. It features a mobile education center that includes photos of those on The Wall and in the In Memory program from the state where the exhibit is on display as well as items representative of those left at The Wall over the years to tell the story of the war and The Wall. The exhibit also includes a replica In Memory plaque. To see the schedule for The Wall That Heals, go to www.vvmf.org/the-wall-that-heals

== The Wall of Faces ==
VVMF has an initiative to find pictures of all those whose names are inscribed on The Wall. VVMF wants to have digital images and profiles for every service member to further preserve their legacy. As of early 2021, VVMF has collected images for all but 100 service members on The Wall. The Wall of Faces can be found here: www.vvmf.org/thewall

== See also ==
- Vietnam Veterans Memorial
- The Education Center at The Wall
