= The Education Center at The Wall =

- Location within Washington, D.C.
- Coordinates: 38.891861°N 77.049861°W
- Public transit access: Foggy Bottom – GWU
- Website: www.vvmf.org/education-center

The Education Center at The Wall was a collaborative effort between the National Park Service and the Vietnam Veterans Memorial Fund (VVMF). The Center was approved by Congress, and construction was planned for the National Mall site adjacent to the Vietnam Memorial and on the corner of Constitution Avenue and 23rd Street. The two-story underground learning facility would have been built in keeping with the design, tone, and mood of The Wall and so as not to detract from the historic vistas of the National Mall. VVMF canceled the project in 2018 due to fundraising challenges.

The purpose of the Education Center was to inform future generations of the honor and sacrifices made by those who served their country. The center's core would revolve around seven traits that embody the American service member throughout the generations: Loyalty, Duty, Respect, Service, Honor, Integrity, and Courage. A prominent feature of the Education Center was to be the larger-than-life pictures of service members whose names adorn the polished black panels of The Wall. The pictures would be displayed on the service members' birthdays and add faces to the more than 58,000 names on The Wall and tell the stories of those who served. Volunteers sought to find photos of each of the veterans, along with service background information on computers at the Education Center and online for non-local visitors. The Education Center would have also featured displays of the more than 400,000 personal articles, letters, and gifts that have been left at the foot of the memorial since its dedication in 1982.

Like the Vietnam Veterans Memorial, the Education Center at The Wall was completely funded through private donations. The Vietnam Veterans Memorial Fund embarked on a multi-year campaign to secure the nearly $115 million needed. The campaign leadership included Gen. Colin Powell USA (Ret.) and Gen. Barry A. McCaffrey USA (Ret.). Actor Tom Selleck served as the National Spokesman. In September 2018 the Fund announced it would scrap its plans for construction of the center and instead focus on digital education and outreach.
