= Statue of Jimmy Carter =

Statue in Georgia, United States

Jimmy Carter statue
- Jimmy Carter statue (2020)
- Interactive map of Jimmy Carter statue
- Location: Georgia State Capitol, Atlanta, Georgia, United States
- Coordinates: 33.7494°N 84.3883°W
- Designer: Frederick Hart
- Material: Bronze
- Dedicated date: June 7, 1994
- Dedicated to: Jimmy Carter

The Jimmy Carter statue is a monumental statue in Atlanta, Georgia, United States. Located on the grounds of the Georgia State Capitol, the statue was designed by Frederick Hart and depicts Jimmy Carter, former president of the United States. It was dedicated in 1994.

== History ==
Georgia native Jimmy Carter served as the 39th president of the United States from 1977 to 1981. This statue honoring him was unveiled on June 7, 1994. Frederick Hart served as the designer for the statue. In 1976, Hart had served as a volunteer on Carter's campaign during the 1976 United States presidential election. Hart sculpted much of the statue from photographs of Carter, but he met with him in person at the Carter Center in Atlanta in order to sculpt his head. The statue was the eighth monument erected on the grounds of the Georgia State Capitol, and initially there had been concerns that the area would be too "crowded" to accommodate the statue of Carter.

The unveiling ceremony was attended by Carter, former First Lady Rosalynn Carter, Georgia Governor Zell Miller, and Jody Powell, Carter's White House Press Secretary. The total cost of the monument was approximately $400,000.

== Design ==
The statue of Carter is made of bronze and rests on a granite slab. Hart wished to portray Carter as an "everyman" and a "working man", and thus the statue depicts him in khakis and with the sleeves of his shirt rolled up. Hart chose not to include a grin on Carter's face, as he thought it would look like a caricature. Carter's arms are outstretched with open palms, and his belt buckle depicts a fish on it. A 12,000-pound (5,400 kg) granite slab serves as a backdrop for the statue, which is surrounded by an elliptical plaza that features four benches, also made of granite, that are each inscribed with phrases relating to Carter's life, such as "humanitarian", "peacemaker", and "teacher".

== See also ==
- 1994 in art
- Jimmy Carter Peanut Statue
- List of sculptures of presidents of the United States
