= Sandie Fauriol =

American nonprofit executive and organizer

Sandra E. "Sandie" Fauriol was an American nonprofit executive and organizer associated with veterans' commemorative, educational, and public-history initiatives during the 1980s. She worked with the Vietnam Veterans Memorial Fund, directed the National Salute to Vietnam Veterans, and later co-founded the Project on the Vietnam Generation with John P. Wheeler III.

== Career ==
Before joining the Vietnam Veterans Memorial Fund, Fauriol had worked on a capital fundraising campaign for Planned Parenthood.

In 1982, ''The New York Times'' identified Fauriol as director of the National Salute to Vietnam Veterans, a four-day welcome-home event organized in Washington in connection with the Vietnam Veterans Memorial fund.

Fauriol was active in the campaign to build the Vietnam Veterans Memorial in Washington, D.C. During the memorial's 1982 groundbreaking ceremony, the Congressional Record identified her directing participants in the ceremonial turning of earth. Later that year, United Press International identified Fauriol as director of the National Salute to Vietnam Veterans, a five-day series of events held in Washington during the dedication of the memorial. During dedication week for the Vietnam Veterans Memorial, November 13 1982, at the first Reading of the Names at the Washington National Cathedral, she and David DeChant read the first group of names.

The New York Times later identified Fauriol as Wheeler's deputy during activities connected with the memorial. During her tenure, the memorial campaign reported net proceeds of $6,875,583. She received the Association of Fund Raising Professionals' 1983 Award for Outstanding Fundraising Professional in 1984.

In the mid-1980s, Fauriol and Wheeler founded the Project on the Vietnam Generation, a nonprofit organization devoted to research and public discussion on the long-term effects of the Vietnam era. By 1986, she was executive director of the project. In an interview with The Washington Post, Fauriol commented on changing political attitudes among members of the Vietnam generation.

In 1987, Fauriol was listed as a member of the Education Council of the Vietnam Women's Memorial Project, where she was identified as executive director of the Center for the Study of the Vietnam Generation. In December, she was identified by the Los Angeles Times as former executive director of a Washington center dedicated to education about the Vietnam War. Fauriol said the Vietnam Veterans Memorial had helped make the war "a topic to study and talk about" by giving the public a visible symbol through which discussion could take place.
