= Transfusion (short story) =

- Short story by Chad Oliver
- Genre(s): Science fiction

Publication
- Publisher: Astounding Science Fiction
- Publication date: June 1959

Transfusion is a science fiction short story by American writer Chad Oliver, first published in the magazine Astounding Science Fiction in June, 1959. Like many of his stories, it puts the author's own profession of anthropology into a science fiction context. In this case, the addition of time travel theoretically enables the scientists to observe primitive humans in the past. The results, however, are unexpected.

== Plot summary ==
Anthropologists Ben Hazard and Ed Stone join a top-secret project which uses a time-travel device, affectionately known as "the Bucket", to return in time to observe human development throughout history. They are shocked to discover that, if they travel far enough into the past to research hominids such as Sinanthropus, they find nothing. There is no trace of humans or any related species in the deep past.

Hazard returns from a trip in which he proves that Sinanthropus did not exist in the time indicated by the age of the bones. He, Stone and their mentor, Franz Gottwald, discuss the problem. Gottwald, a by-the-book scientist, insists on facts, not speculation. They therefore decide on an exhaustive effort to discover when, and how, humans did appear on Earth.

Travelling back and forth in the past, Hazard and Stone happen upon an extraordinary event in France, over 25,000 years ago, near a cave where Cro-Magnon remains were found in their time. They see a gigantic spaceship land. Humans emerge, along with robots of various shapes and sizes. Using fantastic technology they shape the land into a primitive home, complete with artifacts such as stone tools. They deposit some apparently brainwashed humans wearing animal skins. They also bury objects in local caves. Hazard is sure that these are bones left for future generations to find.

Returning to modern times, they join Gottwald to try to solve the mystery. Clearly humans did not arise on Earth. The bones planted were probably genuine, but must have been brought from the real home of humanity. They can understand why humans might be seeded on another world, but not why the bones were planted.

Hazard takes a fishing trip to take his mind off the problem, hoping that an idea will occur to him. Remembering one of the chimpanzees used by his project trying to solve a simple puzzle, he decides that the whole thing is a gigantic experiment, a puzzle to be solved with some reward at the end. He also realizes that a necessary part of the experiment is an observer, someone who can monitor it. Such a person would want to get close to the time-travel project, and the best candidate is Gottwald himself, who came from Europe and never talks about his past.

Hazard finds Gottwald's house deserted. Entering, he finds a letter addressed to him, from Gottwald. It tells him that he has solved part of the puzzle, and for the rest he must press a hidden button and stand outside. He does this and is transported to the spaceship, still in orbit about Earth after 25,000 years. There he meets Gottwald and his wife, who are the last survivors of the people who came in the ship. Humans arose on a distant world, discovered faster-than-light space travel, carved an empire for themselves, and were then almost exterminated by the Enemy, a race of vicious monsters. So horrific are these creatures that they are part of human "racial memory", being the demons and dragons and other creatures out of nightmare.

The ship is one of four sent as a last desperate measure. The human race had to start again. It needed a "transfusion" of new ideas and ways of thinking, in order to survive the inevitable future encounter with the Enemy. Gottwald tells Hazard that his people never discovered time-travel. It may be the answer they were seeking. They wait for Ed Stone, who will surely solve the problem and join them. After that, they will begin the process of giving the ship's technology back to humanity, so they can be ready for the battles to come.
