= Project on the Vietnam Generation =

Research initiative on the Vietnam-era generation

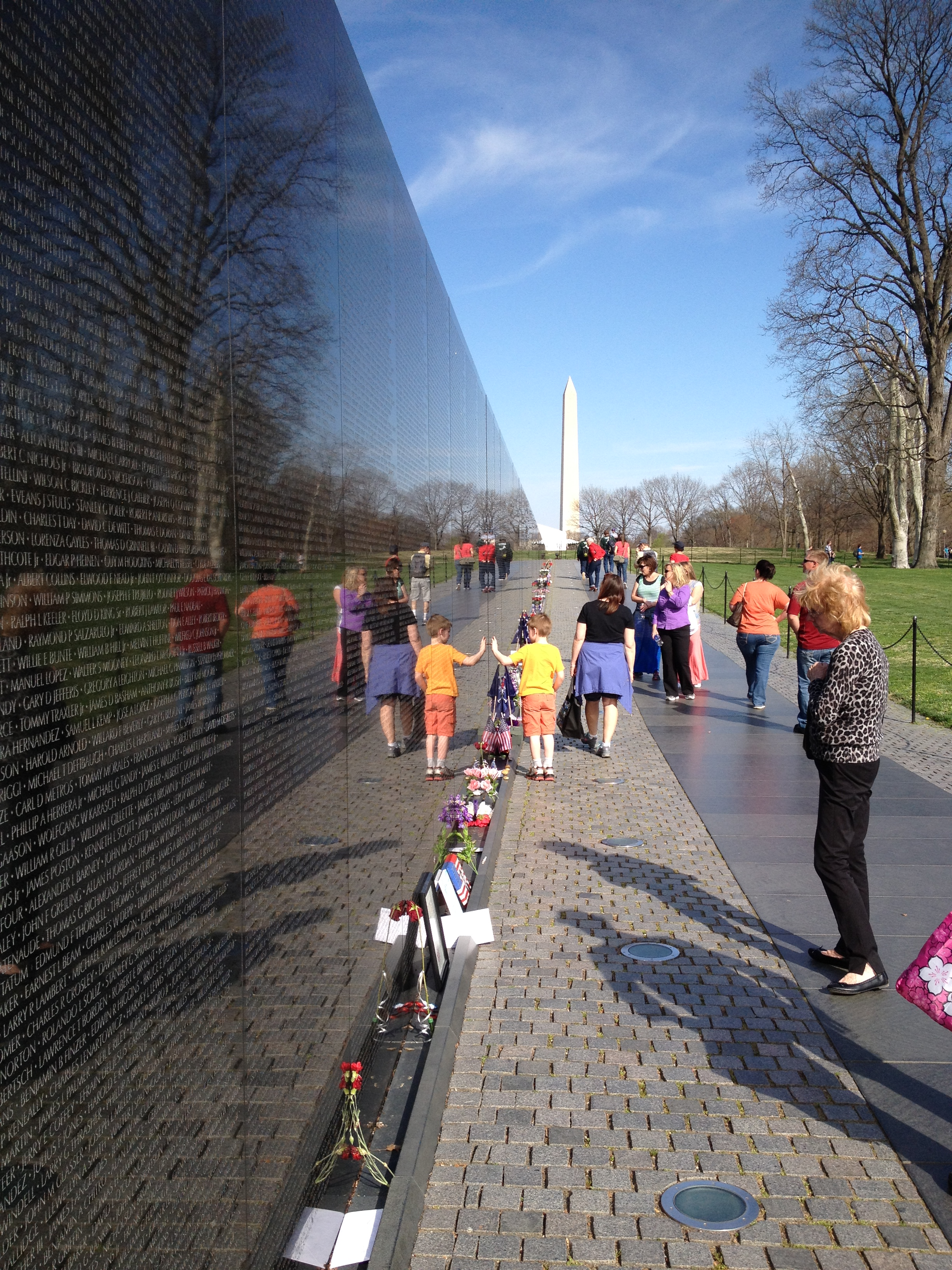
- The Vietnam Veterans Memorial renewed public discussion of the war.
- Founded: Mid-1980s
- Founder: John Wheeler
- Type: Research initiative
- Purpose: Vietnam-era studies; generational research
- Headquarters: Washington, D.C., United States
- Location: National Museum of American History (early offices)
- Key people: John Wheeler (president); Sandie Fauriol (executive director); Stephen Sonnenberg (director of research)

The Project on the Vietnam Generation was an American nonprofit organization founded in Washington, D.C., in the mid-1980s to study how the Vietnam War and the broader Vietnam era affected American society. Its organizers used the term "Vietnam generation" for those whose lives were shaped by the war, military service, protest movements, and the political changes of the period.

Founded by John Wheeler and Sandie Fauriol, the project conducted surveys of university courses, organized conferences, and published newsletters and research reports. In 1987 it was renamed the Center for the Study of the Vietnam Generation. Its work was noted in The New York Times, The Washington Post, and the Chicago Tribune.

== Origins ==
The project grew out of renewed interest in the Vietnam era during the early 1980s, following a period of relative public silence after the war. Early conceptual work appeared under the title The Century Generation, which framed the group more broadly as Americans shaped by the post-World War II period, the civil rights movement, and the Vietnam War. By the mid-1980s, this framework had narrowed to focus more specifically on the Vietnam era as a defining experience.

The initiative was founded by John Wheeler and Sandie Fauriol, following their involvement with the Vietnam Veterans Memorial Fund.

By 1985, the project had begun organizing a national effort to support and coordinate academic study of the Vietnam era. Surveys documented a rapid expansion of university courses addressing Vietnam and related topics, including civil rights, protest movements, and Watergate, reflecting growing interest in the period as a connected historical experience.

By late 1985, it also served as a clearinghouse for this emerging field, compiling directories of scholars, distributing teaching materials, and facilitating collaboration.

In 1986, the project moved toward more formal program development. It advanced a working definition of the "Vietnam generation" as those coming of age between 1963 and 1972, bounded by the assassination of President Kennedy and the early 1970s end of U.S. involvement in Vietnam. Research programs included study groups, conferences, and planned publications intended to strengthen the field.

== Later developments ==
By 1987, Sandie Fauriol, the project's former executive director, described the organization as a Washington center dedicated to education about the Vietnam War that had merged with the Indochina Institute at George Mason University.

== Organization ==
The project was led by John Wheeler as president, with Sandie Fauriol as executive director. Psychiatrist Stephen M. Sonnenberg served as director of research, overseeing the development of research programs, study groups, and publications. Administrative support was provided by Marney Hawkins. Its board of directors included attorney George W. Mayo Jr., attorney John Paul Ketels, and Suzanne H. Woolsey.

The project’s National Advisory Board included figures from government, academia, journalism, and business, including Walter H. Capps, Clayborne Carson, Sara M. Evans, James Fallows, Matina S. Horner, Mary E. King, Elliot L. Richardson, Charles S. Robb, Sargent Shriver, and Frederick W. Smith.

In 1987, John Kerry was added to the board.

== Research and approach ==
The project’s work centered on understanding how the Vietnam era shaped identity, values, and institutions in the United States. It treated the war as part of a broader set of developments, including civil rights activism, political protest, and changes in social norms.

Research methods included archival study, analysis of public policy, and interviews with participants and decision-makers.

Stephen M. Sonnenberg, serving as director of research, contributed to the project’s intellectual direction, including work on the psychological dimensions of war and its implications for public policy.

== Activities ==
The project developed a national network of scholars, educators, and public figures, and expanded its visibility through conferences, publications, and media coverage. Contemporary reporting described growing student and public interest in understanding the Vietnam era and its legacy.

It also engaged with questions of public memory, including the role of the Vietnam Veterans Memorial and related commemorative efforts across the United States.

In 1987, the Center reported that its survey of university courses on Vietnam-era subjects had attracted media attention and inquiries. It also noted that 60 Minutes had filmed Walter Capps's University of California, Santa Barbara course on the Vietnam War, reflecting growing national interest in how the era was being taught in colleges and universities. The segment aired in October 1987.

By the late 1980s, the project had become a more formal research entity, later known as the Center for the Study of the Vietnam Generation. It operated as a research hub and clearinghouse for scholarship.

Its activities were supported by private funding and fundraising efforts, including the use of photographer Michael Katakis’s image Wall 25, Line 91, the proceeds of which were directed to the project. The project also intersected with academic networks associated with Walter H. Capps.

=== Teaching resources and film guides ===
As part of its role as a clearinghouse for instructors, the Center circulated lists of films reported in university courses on Vietnam-era subjects and identified additional audiovisual resources for classroom use. Titles listed in its 1987 survey update ranged from major feature films to documentaries and public television productions, reflecting the interdisciplinary character of courses on the war, protest movements, veterans, and the wider culture of the period.

Films and series specifically listed included Apocalypse Now (1979), In the Year of the Pig (1968), The Anderson Platoon (1967), Basic Training (1971), The Atomic Cafe (1982), The Visitors (1972), and the television documentary series Vietnam: A Television History and Vietnam: The Ten Thousand Day War. Other titles addressed the domestic legacy of the conflict, including Kent State May 1970, America After Vietnam, and How Far Home: Veterans After Vietnam.

== Reception ==
The project and its work received coverage in national media. Reporting in the Chicago Tribune described growing efforts to incorporate the Vietnam War into university curricula, while articles in The Washington Post and The New York Times noted increasing public and academic interest in understanding the era and its generational impact. Insight on the News also covered the project as part of a broader effort to study the Vietnam generation and its influence on American society.

== Legacy ==
The Project on the Vietnam Generation contributed to the emergence of Vietnam-era studies as a distinct field of inquiry, emphasizing the broader social, political, and cultural consequences of the period beyond military history.

== See also ==
- Vietnam Veterans Memorial Fund
- Vietnam Veterans Memorial
- Vietnam Veterans of America
