= Another Kind =

1955 collection of science fiction short stories by Chad Oliver

- First edition
- Author: Chad Oliver
- Cover artist: Richard M. Powers
- Language: English
- Genre: Science fiction
- Publisher: Ballantine Books
- Publication date: 1955
- Publication place: United States
- Media type: Print (hardback)
- Pages: 190
- OCLC: 301196212

Another Kind is a collection of science fiction short stories by American writer Chad Oliver. It was issued in hardcover and paperback by Ballantine Books in 1955 and a German translation was issued in 1965. It was Oliver's first collection.

== Contents ==
- "The Mother of Necessity", (original)
- "Rite of Passage", (Astounding 1954)
- "Scientific Method", (Science-Fiction Plus 1953)
- "Night", (If 1955)
- "Transformer", (F&SF 1954)
- "Artifact", (F&SF 1955)
- "A Star Above It", (original)

"Scientific Method" was originally published as "Hands Across Space".

== Reception ==
The New York Times reviewer Villiers Gerson faulted Oliver's "uniformly quiet, underwritten style," declaring the "cumulative effect" of the stories was "emotional monotony; too cerebral for more than mild entertainment, they are clever fugues written in a minor key." The Hartford Courant's George W. Earley praised Oliver's "excellent stories", saying he "has created some compellingly believable alien and earthly civilizations".
