= Darth Vader grotesque =

Stone artwork in Washington, D.C.

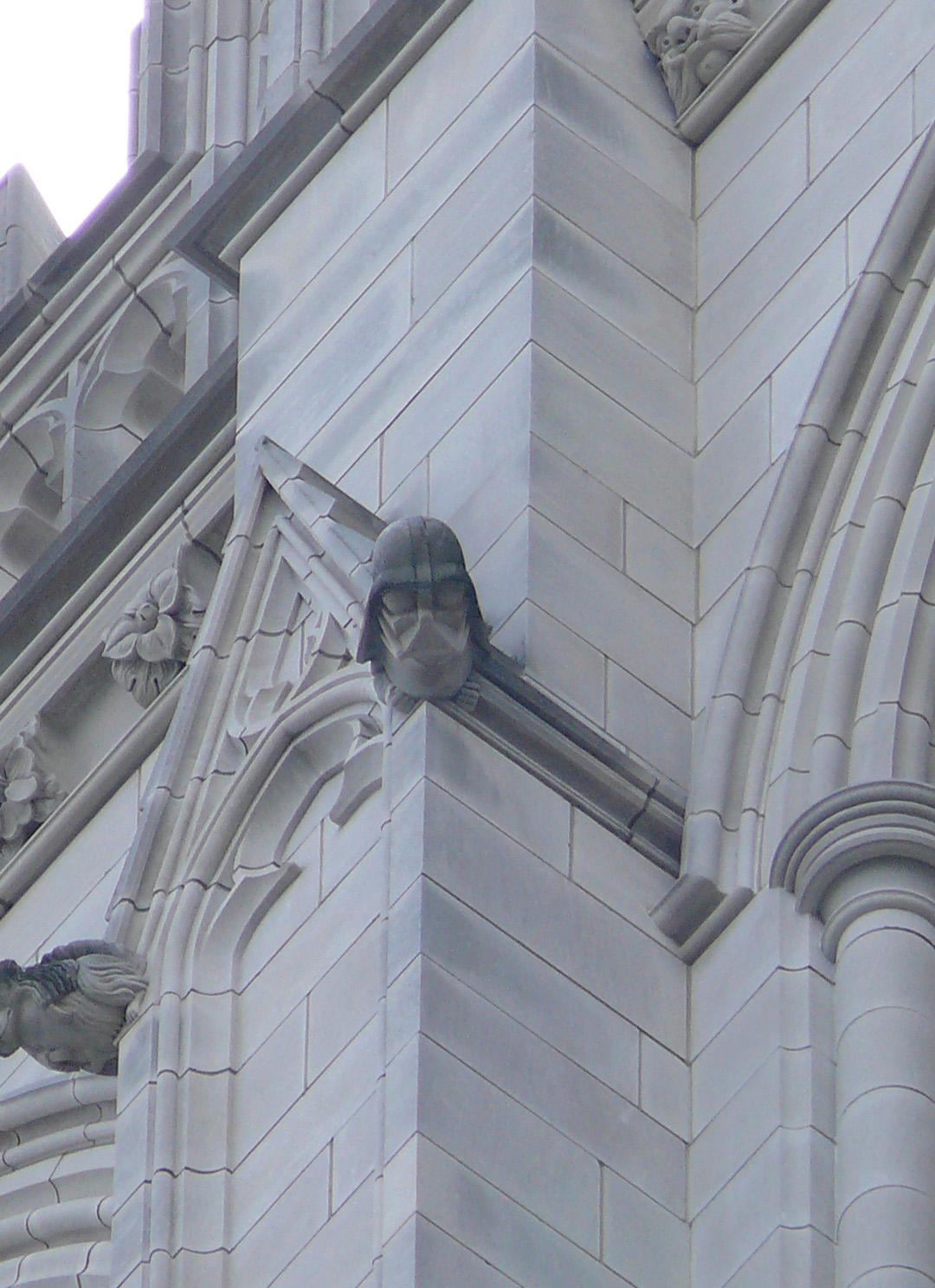
- Year: 1980
- Type: Limestone
- Location: Washington, D.C.; 38.9305°N 77.0715°W
- Owner: Washington National Cathedral

The Darth Vader grotesque is a limestone grotesque by Jay Hall Carpenter. It is located at the Washington National Cathedral in Northwest, Washington, D.C., United States. Though sometimes assumed to be a graffito or form of vandalism on the church (due to the pop culture subject matter contrasted with the religious building), it is a deliberate approved addition.

The Darth Vader grotesque is one of many grotesques that are part of the National Cathedral's rain control system. The grotesques deflect rainwater by bouncing it off the tops of their heads and away from the stone walls.

In the 1980s, during the construction of the northwest tower, a children's competition was run by National Geographic World to draw grotesques for the building. Christopher Rader won third-place, with his drawing of Star Wars villain Darth Vader. The head was sculpted by Jay Hall Carpenter and the stonecarver was Patrick J. Plunkett. The Darth Vader grotesque is difficult to see with the naked eye, and binoculars are generally needed to spot it. It is located on the north side of the cathedral. Other winning designs were a raccoon, a girl with pigtails and braces, and a man with large teeth and an umbrella.
