= Anthropological science fiction =

Genre of literature

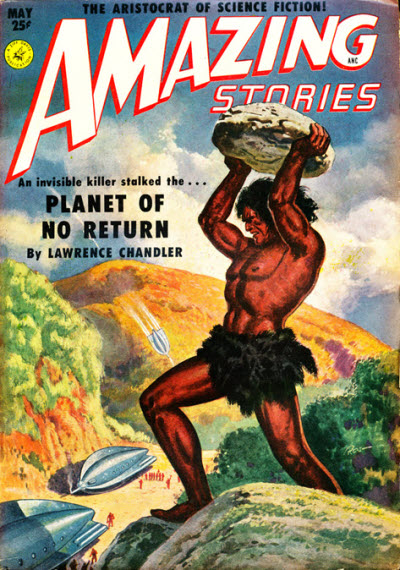
A primitive man clad in furs attacks spaceship travellers.

Anthropological science fiction is a subgenre of science fiction that incorporates concepts and methods from anthropology, particularly the study of culture, society, and human evolution. Writers in the genre frequently use speculative settings to examine social organization, cultural difference, religion, language, and human behavior, while drawing on anthropological ideas and research.

Definitions of anthropological science fiction vary, and critics have debated the boundaries of the subgenre. Although it has often been described as a primarily late twentieth-century development associated with writers such as Ursula K. Le Guin, Michael Bishop, Joanna Russ, Ian Watson, and Chad Oliver, earlier works by authors such as H. G. Wells have also been identified as important precursors.

Anthropological themes in science fiction have included depictions of prehistoric humans, alternative models of social development, and encounters with non-human societies. Works by authors such as H. G. Wells, L. Sprague de Camp, Philip José Farmer, William Golding, and Robert J. Sawyer have been discussed as examples of the genre's engagement with anthropology, human evolution, and cultural difference.

== Overview ==
The boundaries of anthropological science fiction as a subgenre have been debated by critics and scholars. A reviewer in American Anthropologist argued that stories featuring anthropologists or vague references to culture do not necessarily qualify as anthropological science fiction. Critics have noted that the subgenre complicates distinctions between anthropological and hard science fiction, since anthropological approaches to speculative societies derive from the social sciences rather than the natural sciences.

The subgenre has been associated with speculative fiction about human evolution and prehistoric societies. H. G. Wells's "The Grisly Folk" has been identified as an early example because of its depiction of Neanderthals and early humans. Similar themes later appeared in works such as Robert J. Sawyer's The Neanderthal Parallax, which explores alternative forms of human evolution and social organization.

The editors of a collection of anthropological SF stories observed that fiction writers are more free to speculate than scientists:

Anthropology is the science of man. It tells the story from ape-man to spaceman, attempting to describe in detail all the epochs of this continuing history. Writers of fiction, and in particular science fiction, peer over the anthropologists' shoulders as the discoveries are made, then utilize the material in fictional works. Where the scientist must speculate reservedly from known fact and make a small leap into the unknown, the writer is free to soar high on the wings of fancy.

Charles F. Urbanowicz, Professor of Anthropology, California State University, Chico has said of anthropology and SF:

Anthropology and science fiction often present data and ideas so bizarre and unusual that readers, in their first confrontation with both, often fail to appreciate either science fiction or anthropology. Intelligence does not merely consist of fact, but in the integration of ideas -- and ideas can come from anywhere, especially good science fiction!

This difficulty of categorization explains the exclusions necessary when seeking the origins of the subgenre. Thus:

Nineteenth-century utopian writings and lost-race sagas notwithstanding, anthropological science fiction is generally considered a late-twentieth-century phenomenon, best exemplified by the work of writers such as Ursula K. Le Guin, Michael Bishop, Joanna Russ, Ian Watson, and Chad Oliver.

Again, questions of description are not simple as Gary Westfahl observes:

... others present hard science fiction as the most rigorous and intellectually demanding form of science fiction, implying that those who do not produce it are somehow failing to realize the true potential of science fiction. This is objectionable ...; writers like Chad Oliver and Ursula K. Le Guin, for example, bring to their writing a background in anthropology that makes their extrapolated aliens and future societies every bit as fascinating and intellectually involving as the technological marvels and strange planets of hard science fiction. Because anthropology is a social science, not a natural science, it is hard to classify their works as hard science fiction, but one cannot justly construe this observation as a criticism.

== Authors and works ==
=== Chad Oliver ===
Anthropological science fiction is best exemplified by the work of writers such as Ursula K. Le Guin, Michael Bishop, Joanna Russ, Ian Watson, and Chad Oliver. Of this pantheon, Oliver is alone in being also a professional anthropologist, author of academic tomes such as Ecology and Cultural Continuity as Contributing Factors in the Social Organization of the Plains Indians (1962) and The Discovery of Anthropology (1981) in addition to his anthropologically inflected science fiction. Although he tried, in a superficial way, to separate these two aspects of his career, signing his anthropology texts with his given name "Symmes C. Oliver", he nonetheless saw them as productively interrelated. "I like to think," he commented in a 1984 interview, "that there's a kind of feedback ... that the kind of open-minded perspective in science fiction conceivably has made me a better anthropologist. And on the other side of the coin, the kind of rigor that anthropology has, conceivably has made me a better science fiction writer."

Thus "Oliver's Unearthly Neighbors (1960) highlights the methods of ethnographic fieldwork by imagining their application to a nonhuman race on another world. His Blood's a Rover (1955 [1952]) spells out the problems of applied anthropology by sending a technical-assistance team to an underdeveloped planet. His Rite of Passage (1966 [1954]) is a lesson in the patterning of culture, how humans everywhere unconsciously work out a blueprint for living. Anthropological wisdom is applied to the conscious design of a new blueprint for American society in his Mother of Necessity (1972 [1955])". Oliver's The Winds of Time is a "science fiction novel giving an excellent introduction to the field methods of descriptive linguistics".

In 1993, a journal of SF criticism requested from writers and critics of SF a list of their 'most neglected' writers, and Chad Oliver was listed in three replies. Among the works chosen were: Shadows in the Sun, Unearthly Neighbors, and The Shores of Another Sea.

In Shadows in the Sun, the protagonist, anthropologist Paul Ellery, discovers extraterrestrials living in Jefferson Springs, Texas. The novel treats the aliens as societies that can be understood through anthropology rather than as technologically superior beings. Their weaknesses and social divisions make them vulnerable, and the solution to their colonization lies in cultural understanding rather than advanced technology.

A reviewer of The Shores of Another Sea finds the book "curiously flat despite its exploration of an almost mythical, and often horrific, theme". The reviewer's reaction is not surprising because, as Samuel Gerald Collins points out in the 'New Wave Anthropology' section of his comprehensive review of Chad Oliver's work: "In many ways, the novel is very much unlike Oliver's previous work; there is little moral resolution, nor is anthropology of much help in determining what motivates the aliens. In striking contrast to the familiar chumminess of the aliens in Shadows in the Sun and The Winds of Time, humans and aliens in Shores of Another Sea systematically misunderstand one another." At the conclusion of his essay, discussing Chad Oliver's legacy Collins says:

The lesson of Chad Oliver for sf is that his Campbell-era commitments to the power of technology, rational thinking, and the evolutionary destiny of "humanity" came to seem an enshrinement of a Western imperialist vision that needed to be transcended, through a rethinking of otherness driven by anthropological theory and practice. Above all, Oliver's career speaks to many of the shared impulses and assumptions of anthropology and sf, connections that have only grown more multifarious and complex since his death in 1993.

=== Ursula K. Le Guin ===
It has often been observed that Ursula K. Le Guin's interest in anthropology and its influence on her fiction derives from the influence of both her mother Theodora Kroeber, and of her father, Alfred L. Kroeber.

Warren G. Rochelle in his essay on Le Guin notes that from her parents she:

acquired the "anthropological attitude" necessary for the observation of another culture – or for her, the invention of another culture: the recognition and appreciation of cultural diversity, the necessity to be a "close and impartial observer", who is objective, yet recognizes the inescapable subjectivity that comes with participation in an alien culture.

Another critic has observed that Le Guin's "concern with cultural biases is evident throughout her literary career", and continues,

In The Word for World is Forest (1972), for example, she explicitly demonstrates the failure of colonialists to comprehend other cultures, and shows how the desire to dominate and control interferes with the ability to perceive the other. Always Coming Home (1985) is an attempt to allow another culture to speak for itself through songs and music (available in cassette form), writings, and various unclassifiable fragments. Like a documentary, the text presents the audience with pieces of information that they can sift through and examine. But unlike a traditional anthropological documentary, there is no "voice-over" to interpret that information and frame it for them. The absence of "voice-over" commentary in the novel forces the reader to draw conclusions rather than rely on a scientific analysis which would be tainted with cultural blind spots. The novel, consequently, preserves the difference of the alien culture and removes the observing neutral eye from the scene until the very end.

Le Guin's novel The Left Hand of Darkness has been called "the most sophisticated and technically plausible work of anthropological science fiction, insofar as the relationship of culture and biology is concerned", and also rated as "perhaps her most notable book". This novel forms part of Le Guin's Hainish Cycle (so termed because it develops as a whole "a vast story about diverse planets seeded with life by the ancient inhabitants of Hain"). (Note: Hainish series of novels: Rocannon's World (1966), Planet of Exile (1966), City of Illusions (1967), The Left Hand of Darkness (1969), The Word for World is Forest (1972), The Dispossessed (1974)) The series is "a densely textured anthropology, unfolding through a cycle of novels and stories and actually populated by several anthropologists and ethnologists"." Le Guin employs the SF trope of inter-stellar travel which allows for fictional human colonies on other worlds developing widely differing social systems. For example, in The Left Hand of Darkness "a human envoy to the snowbound planet of Gethan struggles to understand its sexually ambivalent inhabitants".

Geoffery Samuel has pointed out some specific anthropological aspect to Le Guin's fiction, noting that:

the culture of the people of Gethen in The Left Hand of Darkness clearly owes a lot to North-West Coast Indian and Eskimo culture; the role of dreams of Athshe (in The Word for World is Forest) is very reminiscent of that described for the Temiar people of Malaysia; and the idea of a special vocabulary of terms of address correlated with a hierarchy of knowledge, in City of Illusions, recalls the honorific terminologies of many Far Eastern cultures (such as Java or Tibet).

However, Fredric Jameson says of The Left Hand of Darkness that the novel is "constructed from a heterogeneous group of narratives modes ...", and that:

... we find here intermingled: the travel narrative (with anthropological data), the pastiche myth, the political novel (in the restricted sense of the drama of court intrigue), straight SF (the Hainish colonization, the spaceship in orbit around Gethen's sun), Orwellian dystopia ..., adventure story ..., and finally even, something like a multiracial love story (the drama of communication between the two cultures and species).

Similarly Adam Roberts warns against a too narrow an interpretation of Le Guin's fiction, pointing out that her writing is always balanced and that "balance as such forms one of her major concerns. Both Left Hand and The Dispossessed (1974) balance form to theme, of symbol to narration, flawlessly". Nevertheless, there is no doubt that the novel The Left Hand of Darkness is steeped in anthropological thought, with one academic critic noting that "the theories of [French anthropologist] Claude Lévi-Strauss provide an access to understanding the workings of the myths" in the novel.
