= Paul Woodruff =

American philosopher (1943–2023)

Paul Bestor Woodruff (August 28, 1943 – September 23, 2023) was an American philosopher who was professor of philosophy and dean of undergraduate studies at The University of Texas at Austin.

== Life and career ==
Born in New Jersey and raised in western Pennsylvania, Woodruff attended Princeton University, where he majored in classics, graduating in 1965. He then studied at Merton College, Oxford as a Marshall Scholar, completing a degree in Literae Humaniores in 1968.

Influenced by Socratic ideas about the rule of law, he served in the United States Army during the Vietnam War from 1969 to 1971, attaining the rank of captain. His later work examined how war affects moral character and the range of human responses to conflict. Returning to the United States, he again attended Princeton University, where he completed his doctorate in philosophy, studying under Gregory Vlastos.

Woodruff joined the department of philosophy at the University of Texas at Austin in 1973, retiring from the department in the fall of 2022. He also served as chair of the department.

He directed the Plan II Honors program from 1991 until 2006, when University President William C. Powers, Jr. named Dr. Woodruff the inaugural dean of undergraduate studies.

Woodruff later published an essay in The Washington Post describing his philosophy of life as he faced death, as the result of bronchiectasis. He died from the condition on September 23, 2023, at the age of 80.

=== Honors and recognition ===
In 2012, colleagues and former students established the Paul B. Woodruff Professorship for Excellence in Undergraduate Studies at the University of Texas, initially raising about $370,000 toward an endowment intended to reach $1 million. The professorship is currently held by Stephen Sonnenberg.

== Bibliography ==
=== Books ===
- Plato (1982). Hippias major. Translated, with commentary and essay, by Paul Woodruff. Indianapolis: Hackett.
- Reverence; Renewing a Forgotten Virtue Oxford University Press (2001)
- First Democracy; The Challenge of an Ancient Idea Oxford University Press (2005)
- The Necessity of Theater; The Art of Watching and Being Watched Oxford University Press (2008)
- The Ajax Dilemma: Justice, Fairness, and Rewards Oxford University Press (2011)

==== Translations ====
- Plato: Two Comic Dialogues (Ion and Hippias Major) Hackett (1983)
- Plato: Symposium (with Alexander Nehamas) Hackett (1999)
- Thucydides on Justice, Power, and Human Nature Hackett (1993)
- Plato: Phaedrus (with Alexander Nehamas) Hackett (1995)
- Euripides: Bacchae Hackett (1998)
- Sophocles: Oedipus Tyrannus (with Peter Meineck) Hackett (2000)
- Sophocles: Antigone Hackett (2001)
- Sophocles: Theban Plays, with Introductions by Paul Woodruff (with Peter Meineck) Hackett (2003)

==== Editor ====
- Facing Evil; Light at the Core of Darkness. (with Harry A. Wilmer) Open Court Press (1988)
- Early Greek Political Thought from Homer to the Sophists (with Michael Gagarin) Cambridge University Press (1995)
- Reason and Religion in Socratic Philosophy (edited, with Nicholas D. Smith) Oxford University Press (2000)

=== Critical studies and reviews ===
- Pigliucci, Massimo (Mar–Apr 2013). "[Untitled review of The Ajax dilemma]". Books. Philosophy Now. 95: 44.

== See also ==
- American philosophy
- List of American philosophers
- Reverence (emotion)
