= Jay Hall Carpenter =

American sculptor (born 1961)

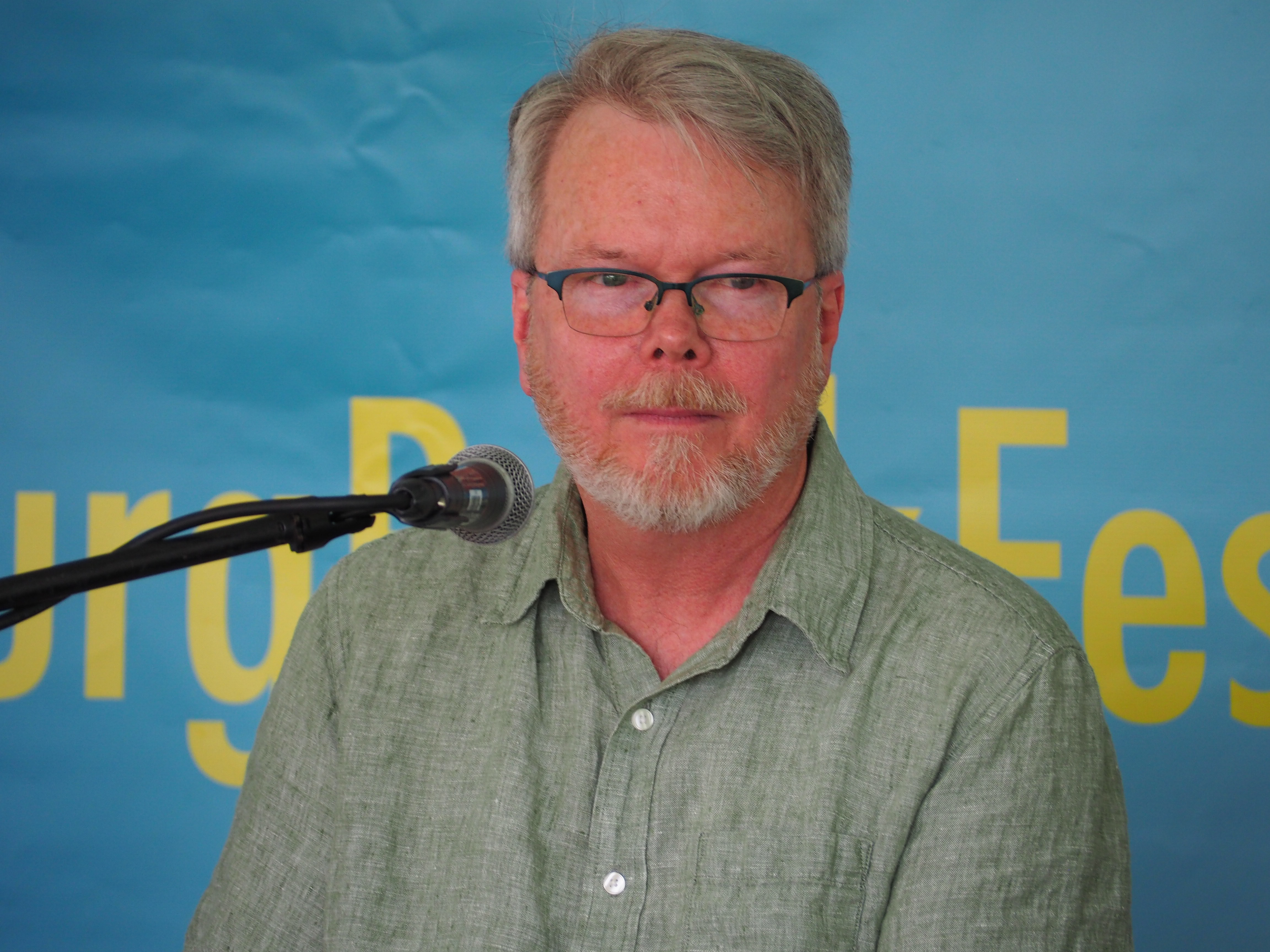
- Born: abt 1961
- Citizenship: U.S.
- Education: Pratt Institute; The Catholic University of America
- Occupation: sculptor
- Known for: Darth Vader grotesque

Jay Hall Carpenter (born 1961) is an American sculptor, perhaps best known as creator of 500 sculptures for the Washington National Cathedral. His oeuvre includes private and public works in the hands of individuals and in American churches, the State Department, the Smithsonian Institution, Canterbury Cathedral, the New England Medical Center, West Point Military Academy, and the State of Maryland. Elected into the National Sculpture Society before the age of thirty, he has won national awards for his sculptures.

Carpenter's education includes studying sculpture at the Pratt Institute and The Catholic University of America, as well as philosophy, religion, acting and playwriting at The Catholic University. He served as sculptor's assistant to Master Sculptor Frederick Elliott Hart on projects for the Washington National Cathedral and the Vietnam Veterans Memorial in Washington, D.C. He has also served as Sculptor-in-Residence at the Washington Cathedral, Wesley Theological Seminary, and The Catholic University of America, and has taught at the Art League School in Alexandria, Virginia, and Montgomery College in Rockville, Maryland.
