= Frederick Hart (sculptor) =

American sculptor (1943-1999)

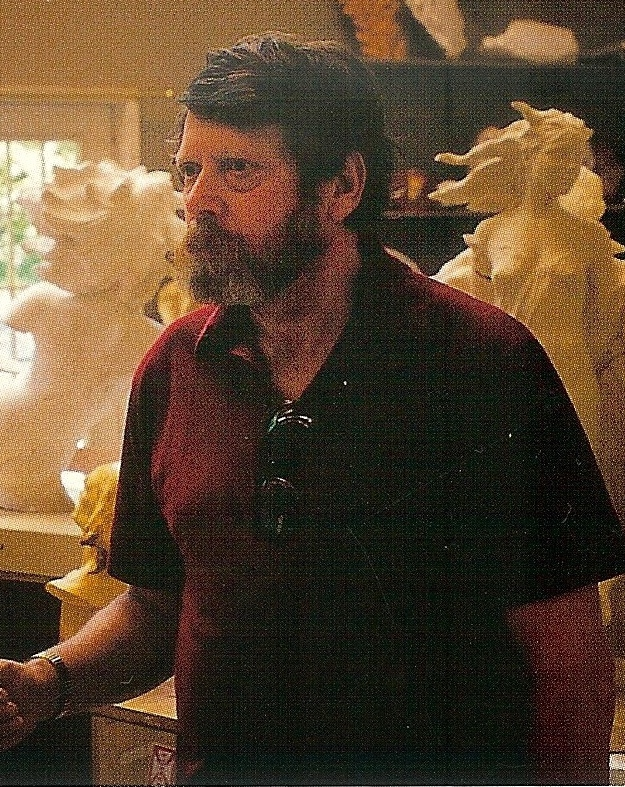
- Frederick Hart in 1996
- Born: Frederick Elliott Hart; November 3, 1943; Atlanta, Georgia
- Died: August 13, 1999 (aged 55); Baltimore, Maryland
- Education: University of South Carolina (expelled); George Washington University (dropped out); American University (dropped out)
- Known for: Sculpture
- Notable work: Ex Nihilo, Washington National Cathedral; The Three Soldiers, Vietnam Veterans Memorial; President James Earl Carter, Georgia State Capitol

Frederick Elliott Hart (November 3, 1943 – August 13, 1999) was an American sculptor. The creator of hundreds of public monuments, private commissions, portraits, and other works of art, Hart is most famous for Ex Nihilo, a part of his Creation Sculptures at Washington National Cathedral, and The Three Servicemen (also known as The Three Soldiers), at the Vietnam Veterans Memorial in Washington, D.C.

Working within the figurative tradition of American Beaux-Arts sculpture, Hart's approach was that of a craftsman. With little formal schooling, he developed his skills on the job, learning ancient techniques from master carvers.

Hart modeled his work in clay. Many of his larger pieces were carved in Italian marble or limestone, or cast in bronze. Throughout his career, Hart explored themes of beauty and spirituality, consciousness and identity, sculpting in transparent and semi-transparent acrylic materials using a process he patented.

Strongly influenced by the dramatic poses of Gian Lorenzo Bernini and Anna Hyatt Huntington, as well as the naturalism of Augustus Saint-Gaudens and Daniel Chester French, Hart's style was also shaped by that of Auguste Rodin, especially in the way he conveyed movement, experimented with abstract forms, and pushed the boundaries of traditional figurative art.

According to J. Carter Brown, Director Emeritus of the National Gallery of Art, “It is breathtaking to see an artist with the technical abilities and devotion to craft of Frederick Hart combine these gifts with an ability to go to the brink with them, but somehow keep the inner, emotional, intellectual and spiritual force of the work dominant." In the words of Tom Wolfe: “Rick is—and I do not say this lightly—America’s greatest sculptor.”

== Early life ==
Frederick "Rick" Hart was born in Atlanta, Georgia, to Joanna Elliott, and Frederick William Hart, a heavy drinker who had served in the United States Navy during World War II. Hart's older brother, also named Frederick William, died as an infant. Hart's mother contracted scarlet fever and died in 1945, when Hart was two.

As he grew up, and his relationship with his father suffered, Hart became known as a troublemaker, and he was sent to live with his maternal grandmother and aunt in Horry County, South Carolina. Hart's father began working as a newspaper reporter in Atlanta, and married Myrtis Mildred Hailey in 1947. Half-sister Chesley Hart was born in 1949. In 1956, they moved to Virginia, near Washington, D.C., and Hart rejoined his family. Although his relationship with his father continued to deteriorate, Hart and his half-sister Chesley became good friends.

Hart was an avid reader, but a troubled student. After failing ninth grade, he was sent back to South Carolina to live with his Aunt Essie, and to repeat the school year. Teachers were worried he would fail out of high school. The principal was almost certain that he would. He challenged Hart to take the A.C.T. to show how little he knew. When Hart achieved a near-perfect score, the principal was stunned. In 1959, he helped sixteen-year-old Hart gain early admission to the University of South Carolina in Columbia, South Carolina.

At the same time, the Civil Rights Movement was gathering strength, and the campaign to desegregate South Carolina's school system began. In Columbia, in 1961, African-American students led 250 in a protest march against racial segregation. Hart was the only white student to join them:

“I was just walking by,” Hart said. “I happened to know some of the demonstrators. They were from Benedict College, a black school in Columbia. I went over and started talking to them. That irritated the volunteer police (who were used for riot control). They told me to move along. At that point, I said, ‘Screw you.’ And I joined the demonstration.”

Hart was expelled from the University of South Carolina, thrown in jail, and then chased out of town by the Ku Klux Klan.

== Artistic career ==
In 1965, Hart’s sister, Chesley, was diagnosed with leukemia. Because her parents were unable to cope with the illness, Chesley's Aunt Grace became her caregiver. Hart tried to stem his family’s disintegration by helping Aunt Grace as much as he could. The next year, when she was just 16, Chesley died.

In the turbulent period after her death, Hart “stumble[d] into a sculpture class at the Corcoran School of Art, and [was] blown away.” Mourning Chesley shaped what Hart would later describe as his “moral responsibility” as an artist. As he said: Art must ”give hope to the darkness.” It ”must be a part of life. It must be an enriching, ennobling and vital partner... It should be a majestic presence in everyday life."

Hart dropped out of the Corcoran, then attended art classes at American University in Washington, D.C., but dropped out again before receiving a degree. While working at Giorgio Gianetti Studio of Architectural Sculpture, he assisted sculptors Felix de Weldon, Carl Mose, Don Turano, and Heinz Warnecke. Hart was also using his time in Washington, D.C., as an opportunity to study the public art of the nation's capital, and absorb the naturalistic style of sculptor Daniel Chester French.

Toward the end of the 1960s, Hart began work on one of his earliest and most personal sculptures, Family. Years later, Hart would say that Family was for him a way to come to terms with Chesley's death; it was an effort to represent an idea of stability, to capture a sense of belonging. The first casting Hart presented as a gift to his girlfriend in 1969. Stylistically, Family signals Hart's tendency to straddle the line between Classical and Romantic sculptural traditions. The heavy pyramidal form of Hart's Family evokes the solidity of French's Abraham Lincoln, but the raw, earthy contours set it apart, and situate it within the Romantic tradition of Rodin.

=== Washington National Cathedral ===
In 1967, Hart took a job as a clerk in the mail room at Washington National Cathedral. He did so for the specific purpose of pestering Roger Morigi. Morigi was the Cathedral's legendary master carver, an Italian immigrant who had carved the iconic frieze of the United States Supreme Court Building. "Highly respected, [Morigi] was a temperamental perfectionist who didn't tolerate incompetence and wasn't shy about sharing his opinions." Hart wanted Morigi to take him on as an apprentice. In time, it worked: Morigi became his mentor. Not only that, he became a father figure to Hart, who had long been estranged from his own parents.

"Working at the cathedral was the best experience of my learning life," Hart said. "It taught me 'how' to work. I wanted to know and feel the discipline—the mastery of stone carving—and I learned that in the hours of working up on the scaffolding in the heat of summer and through the winter." At first, Morigi put Hart to work on floral ornaments, primarily ceiling bosses. Because they were so high up, and far from view, any rookie mistakes would be less noticeable there, but for Hart, this meant scaling more than ten stories of scaffolding, and working high up off the ground. As his training progressed, Morigi gave him more responsibilities. Hart carved reliefs, motifs, and gargoyles, and sculpted a figure of Erasmus. He was on his way to becoming a master carver himself when the Cathedral Building Committee announced a major competition.

=== Creation Sculptures ===
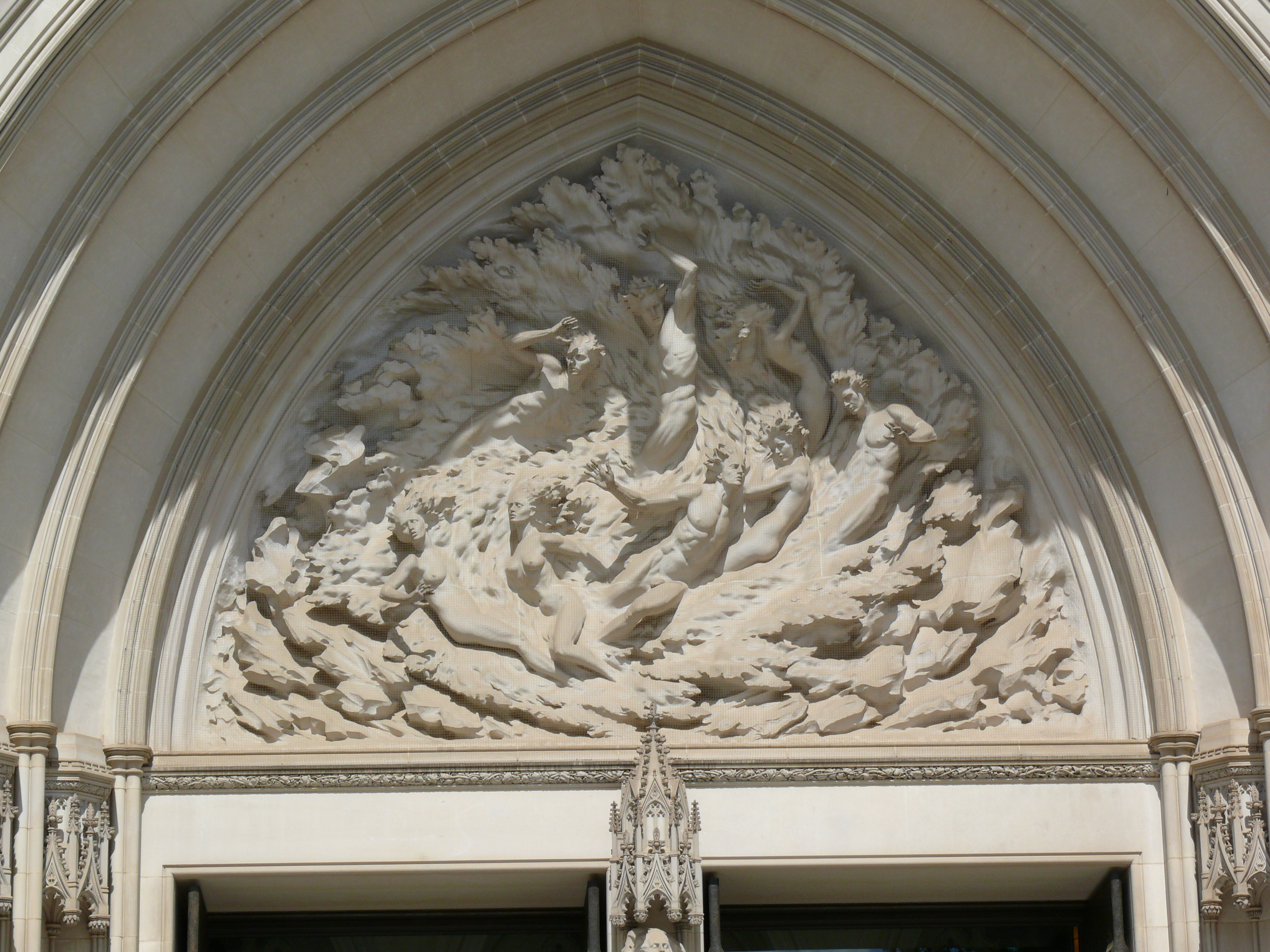
Ex Nihilo (1978–1984)

In 1971, the Washington National Cathedral Building Committee held a competition to determine the appearance of the west façade, the main entrance of the Cathedral. This was not just an important commission, it was a radical break with tradition. In the past, the west façade of a Christian cathedral typically featured a depiction of the Last Judgment; however, the Cathedral Building Committee wanted Washington National Cathedral to be the exception. Instead of the traditional image of judgment and destruction, they wanted to emphasize a message of love and affirmation, and so they specifically asked artists to focus on the theme of Creation.

To an ambitious young artist like Hart, it was an irresistible opportunity: a compelling theme, and a chance to see his own work carved in limestone over the main entrance of the Cathedral. Interestingly, too, the committee was willing to consider nonrepresentational, avant-garde designs, so for three years, Hart sketched in clay. His original tympanum design (from early 1974) was a wide, bare space, from which a woman's face emerges. The Cathedral Building Committee rejected this submission, as well as those of all the other artists. Only three sculptors were invited to submit new proposals. Hart was not one of them. Undeterred, Hart submitted a revised design of his own. Guided by the writings of Pierre Teilhard de Chardin, and the idea of a dynamic universe, whirling into existence, Hart developed a revolutionary, unifying vision for the entire west façade. To the committee's approval, he submitted new models for the central tympanum, for the left and right tympana, and for the figures on the trumeaux below them.

In developing Ex Nihilo—the central sculpture, by far the largest of the group—Hart studied the combination of figurative and abstract forms in Rodin’s massive sculpture, The Gates of Hell. The final, full-size version of Ex Nihilo spans 21 feet, and stands two stories high. "The spiraling forms that recur throughout Hart's Ex Nihilo suggest the spirals that are found in nature—in sunflower heads, nautiluses, hurricanes, and galaxies." Hart intended the title as a double reference to Aristotle ("out of nothing nothing can be made") and the Bible ("everything is made out of nothing").

For the central trumeau, Hart sculpted an image of Adam, and for the tympana on either side, day and night. As a complete sculptural ensemble, the Creation Sculptures constitute "the most monumental commission for religious sculpture in the United States in the twentieth century."

=== Vietnam Veterans Memorial ===
After laboring over the Creation Sculptures for ten years, with the project approaching completion at last, Hart began to look around Washington, D.C., for new jobs. To submit a proposal for the Vietnam Veterans Memorial, Hart teamed up with architect Sheila Brady. Just as in the competition for the Cathedral Building Committee, Hart's initial plan was not accepted. His team placed third. However, in response to the controversy over the winning architect's design, the Vietnam Veterans Memorial Fund tasked Hart, as the most highly ranked sculptor in the competition, to provide a sculptural component. Hart conceived a sculpture of three soldiers "not at the apex [of the wall], as originally planned[,] but 400 feet away from the wall as if looking for their own names."

Hart had become a master carver in 1974, and instead of continuing to work exclusively as a carver, he hoped to build on the success he had already won with more commissions sculpting national monuments. He would bring with him the time-honored techniques he had learned at the Cathedral, as an artisan among artisans, even as he acquired a stronger sense of his own destiny as an original artist, a sense of confidence in his own creative vision and capabilities. Of his work on The Three Soldiers, Hart said he would put the “folds of those fatigue jackets and pants up against the folds of any [carved] medieval angel you can find.”

=== James Earl Carter Presidential Statue ===
In the 1981 competition to design the Carter Presidential Library, Hart was a principal of the winning team with Jova, Daniels, and Busby Architects (Atlanta, Georgia), and EDAW Landscape Design Firm (Alexandria, Virginia). Hart was asked to provide a portrait of President Jimmy Carter, and on June 7, 1994, the statue of Jimmy Carter was unveiled at the Georgia State Capitol in Atlanta. Among the guests were Governor Zell Miller, President Carter, and Mrs. Rosalynn Carter. Hart said:

"I am greatly honored to have been selected to sculpt President Carter, a man who served our country in so many ways. From the Camp David Accords and SALT II treaty, that were among the achievements of his presidency, to the myriad projects he has since undertaken on behalf of human and environmental needs."

"In honor of President Carter’s past work as a farmer as well as his environmental initiatives, and his work on behalf of grassroots organizations, I have sculpted him in bronze on a low pedestal, in an informal pose, dressed in khakis with his sleeves rolled up... The gestures of the figure refer to the generosity of Carter’s nature, his eagerness to share a vision of justice, and his unpretentious delight in spreading a message of brotherhood."

Carter said he liked the portrayal: "It was that image that put me in the White House and the governor's office, and I hope I can remain . . . (like that) in the future," he said.

=== Works in acrylic ===
In 1972, Hart opened his own sculpture studio, to create original artwork, and execute commissioned pieces. Hart modeled his figurative style on the dramatic poses and sensuous expressions that he admired in the work of the Italian sculptor Gian Lorenzo Bernini. Many were cast in bronze, some were carved in marble or limestone, but especially after the success of Herself (1984), Hart focused more and more on developing entirely new media for sculpture, using transparent and semi-transparent acrylic materials.

As seen in Elegy (1990), Hart developed an original process for embedding one acrylic sculpture in another. With the liquid look of ice sculptures, and their capacity to refract light, these pieces are perhaps his most distinctive. In these, according to Hart, “The sculpture is defined purely by light.” It is a “very delicate sense of image… suggestive of dreams, memories, and visions.”

“All the clear acrylic resin works are really the offspring of the Cathedral work,” Hart said. “They deal with being and non-being. In the Cathedral, the figures emerge from something that is tangible, from a mass of stone. But more beautifully, in a sense, the clear acrylic figures emerge and disappear.” According to Hart, the innovative sculptural medium creates a “relationship between light and form, and a sense of mystery around being and non-being.”

In honor of the Pope's fifty years of priesthood, Hart presented an acrylic work titled The Cross of the Millennium to Pope John Paul II in a ceremony at the Vatican in 1997. When it was unveiled, Pope John Paul II called the sculpture “a profound theological statement for our day.” Hart sculpted a smaller version of The Cross of the Millennium, cast and released as a limited edition.

Hart hoped to use acrylic on a monumental scale, for a public art project, but died before he was able to do so. Today, much of what he sculpted in acrylic remains in private collections. Among these pieces, Hart's later works tend to be "distinguished by an allusive rather than representational nature."

== Later life ==
Hart supported local civic groups and environmental causes. He donated sculpture to benefit the Design Industries Foundation Fighting AIDS and Operation Smile. In 1995 he created and donated a memorial portrait of African-American educator Ruby Middleton Forsythe, to honor the local hero who devoted her life to teaching in a one-room schoolhouse in a small town in South Carolina, where Hart had grown up.

While researching the Creation Sculptures, Hart studied the Book of Genesis, and became a Roman Catholic. He married Lindy Lain on December 1, 1978, in a civil ceremony, and on June 2, 1980, their marriage was blessed at Saint Matthew's Cathedral. First son Frederick Lain Hart was born June 21, 1980, and second son Alexander Thaddeus Hart was born January 7, 1983.

In 1997, Washington National Cathedral asked Hart to join a lawsuit accusing a major motion picture company of copyright infringement for the appropriation of Ex Nihilo in the 1997 film The Devil's Advocate. Over the course of the initial proceedings, "it soon became clear that the filmmakers had simply placed Ex Nihilo on a computer template, removed one figure, and then manipulated the figures."

However, Hart was cautious because in the 1990s plaintiffs in suits against major corporations were sometimes ridiculed in the media as part of public relations campaigns funded by the corporations themselves. "During sessions at US Federal Court over the case that winter, the strain on Hart was wincingly visible." As stress and mounting legal fees took a toll on Hart's health, in 1998, he suffered a stroke.

A federal judge ruled that unless a settlement could be reached the film's video release would be delayed until the case went to trial; the motion picture company then agreed to edit the scene for future releases, and to attach stickers to unedited videotapes to indicate they intended no relation between the sculpture in the film and Hart's work.

After his stroke, “Hart had pursued a rigorous regimen of physical therapy to regain the use of his left arm. He worked as arduously on his rehabilitation as he had on any work he ever created. Expecting to recover fully, he continued to sculpt almost every day... He was unaware that cancer was invading his body. Three weeks before he died, he became debilitated by pneumonia. It wasn't until a couple of days before the end that the rapidly spreading cancer was discovered.”

Hart died on August 13, 1999, two days after doctors at Johns Hopkins Hospital diagnosed him with cancer.

== Awards and accolades ==
- (1980) awarded a patent for inventing a unique process of embedding one acrylic sculpture within another.
- (1985) appointed to the U.S. Commission of Fine Arts, a seven-member committee that advises the U.S. Government on matters pertaining the arts, and guides the architectural development of the nation's capital.
- (1986) appointed to the Board of Trustees, Brookgreen Gardens Sculpture Collection.
- (1987) received the Henry Hering Award from the National Sculpture Society for sculpture in an architectural setting, shared with architect Philip Frohman (for Washington National Cathedral work).
- (1987) participated in an invitational exhibit of works in Philadelphia in conjunction with the Bicentennial of the U.S. Constitution.
- (1988) received the quadrennial Presidential Design Excellence Award (for Vietnam Veterans Memorial work).
- (1993) received an honorary degree of Doctor of Fine Arts from the University of South Carolina for his "ability to create art that uplifts the human spirit, his commitment to the ideal that art must renew its moral authority by rededicating itself to life, his skill in creating works that compel attention as they embrace the concerns of mankind, and his contributions to the rich cultural heritage of our nation."
- (1998) received the first annual Newington-Cropsey Foundation Award for Excellence in the Arts.
- (2004) awarded (posthumously) the National Medal of Arts, the highest award given to artists and arts patrons by the United States Government, “for his important body of work—including the Washington National Cathedral's Creation Sculptures and the Vietnam Veterans Memorial's Three Soldiers—which heralded a new age for contemporary public art.”

== Legacy ==
According to art historian James M. Goode, "the most significant new figurative works to grace public spaces in Washington during the late twentieth century were created by Frederick Hart." While working with new materials made possible by modern technology, Hart championed craftsmanship and naturalism, and explored new themes. He is admired for his "animated compositions" and "attention to detail." At the time of its dedication, Hart's The Three Soldiers was the first representation of an African American on the National Mall.

Throughout his career, Hart collaborated with sculptor Jay Hall Carpenter. Once Hart's assistant, now an award-winning artist in his own right, Carpenter has produced sculpture for the State Department, the Smithsonian Institution, and Canterbury Cathedral. His recent work includes a portrait of Jim Henson. From 1996 to 1999, Hart’s assistant was the Russian-born sculptor Mikael F. Sogoian.

In his later years, Hart became the center of a group of like-minded artists, poets, and philosophers striving to move beyond the Modernist and Post-Modernist categories which dominated the 20th century. Crediting Hart for a renewal of interest in the human figure in art in the early twenty-first century, one art critic and historian wrote in 2005 that “The work of Frederick Hart is changing the world of art.”

Also in 2005, Songs of Grace was acquired by the State Hermitage Museum in St. Petersburg, Russia. In 2008, the University of Louisville and the Louisville Ballet, Louisville, Kentucky, premiered the ballet, Between Stillness, inspired by the sculpture, Ex Nihilo. In September of the same year, Ex Nihilo, Fragment No.8 was installed at the Lightner Museum in Saint Augustine, Florida.

In May 2019 The Frederick Hart Studio Museum opened in Nashville, Tennessee.

== Notable works ==
- Creation Sculptures (including Ex Nihilo) – West façade of Washington National Cathedral. Commissioned in 1974, and dedicated between 1978 and 1984.
- James E. Webb – Bronze bust of National Aeronautics and Space Administration Administrator James E. Webb for the National Air and Space Museum of the Smithsonian Institution, 1982.
- The Three Soldiers – Vietnam Veterans Memorial in Washington, D.C. Dedicated in 1984.
- Fauquier County Veterans' Memorial – 40' bronze collaboration with sculptor Jay Hall Carpenter, in Warrenton, Virginia, 1991.
- James Earl Carter Presidential Statue – Georgia State Capitol in Atlanta, Georgia. Dedicated in 1994.
- Senator Richard B. Russell sculpture – Rotunda of the Russell Senate Office Building in Washington, D.C. Dedicated in 1996.
- The Cross of the Millennium – Acrylic sculpture presented to Pope John Paul II in 1997 in honor of 50 years of priesthood.
- Songs of Grace – Acrylic sculpture acquired in 2005 for the permanent collection of the State Hermitage Museum in St. Petersburg, Russia.
- Three Soldiers, Detail – Bronze sculpture installed in 2008 and dedicated by Jan C. Scruggs, Founder, Vietnam Veterans Memorial Fund, at the Veterans Memorial Plaza, Apalachicola, Florida.

== Gallery ==
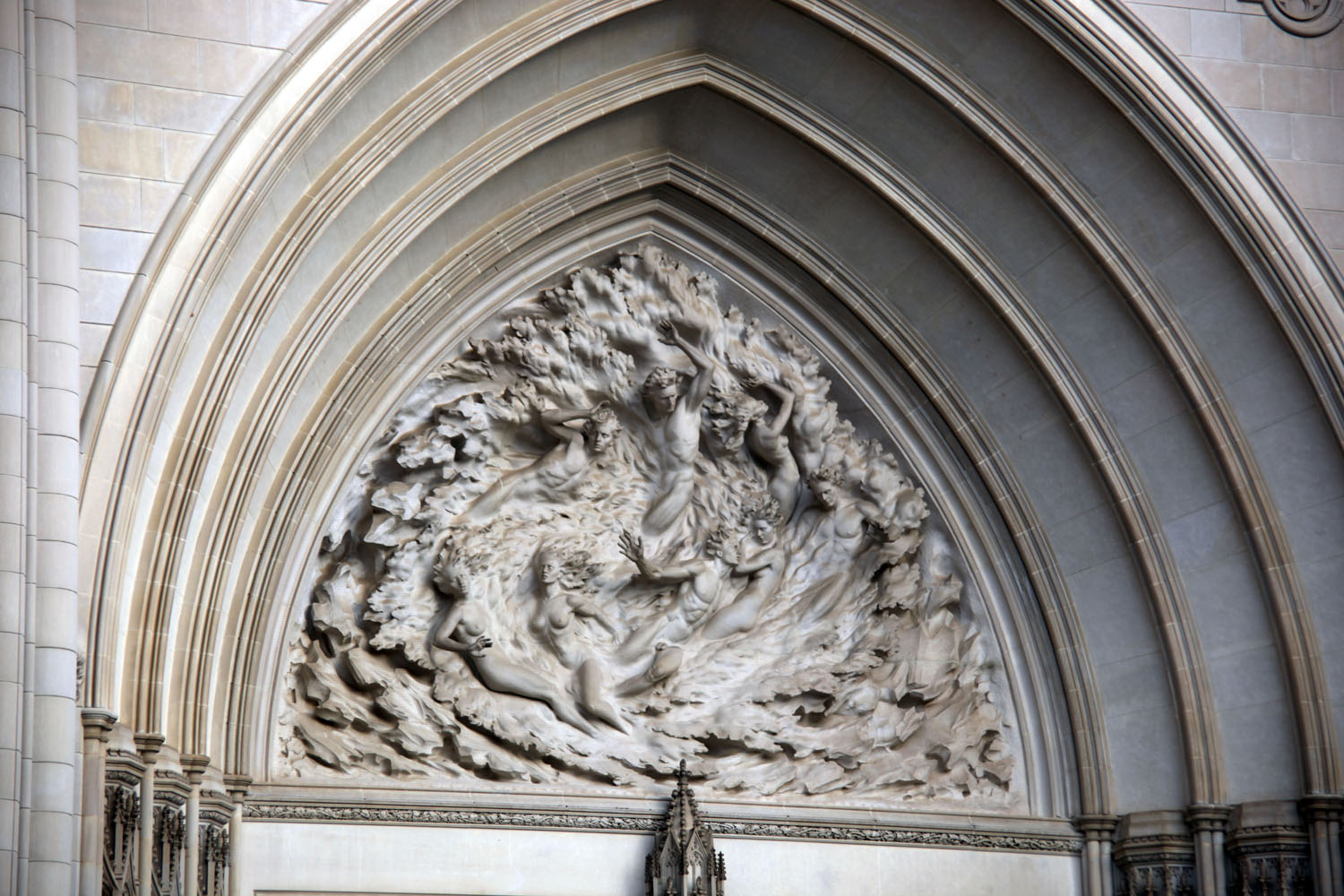
Ex Nihilo (central tympanum, Creation Sculptures) Washington, D.C.

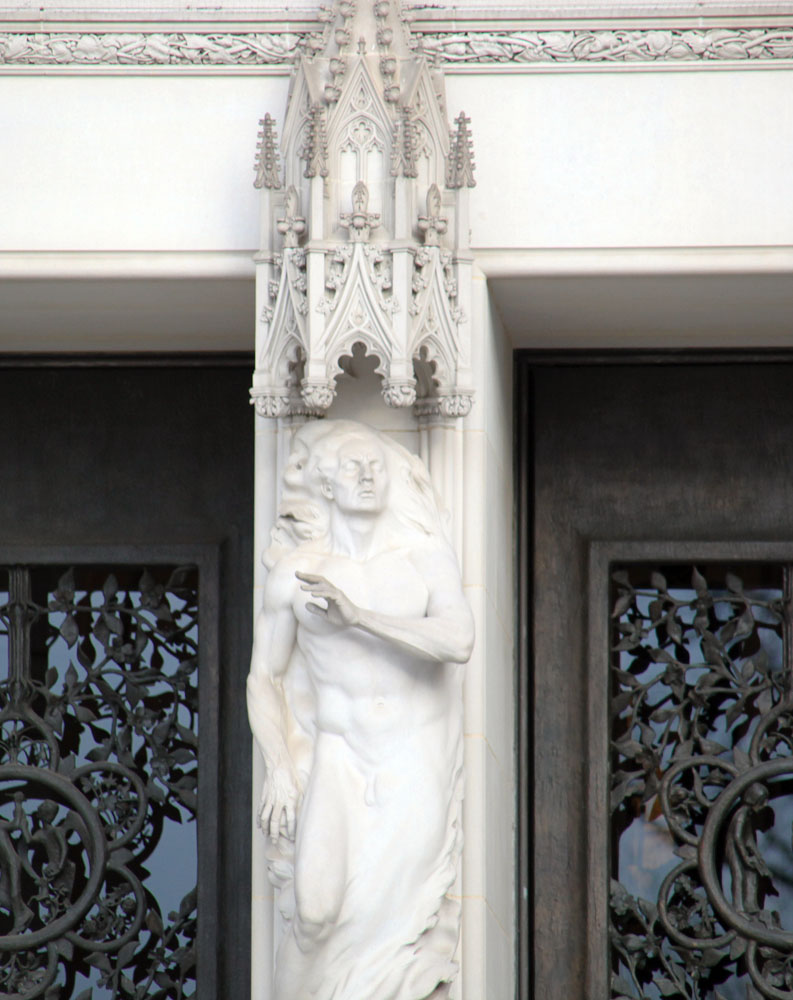
Adam (central trumeau, Creation Sculptures) Washington, D.C.

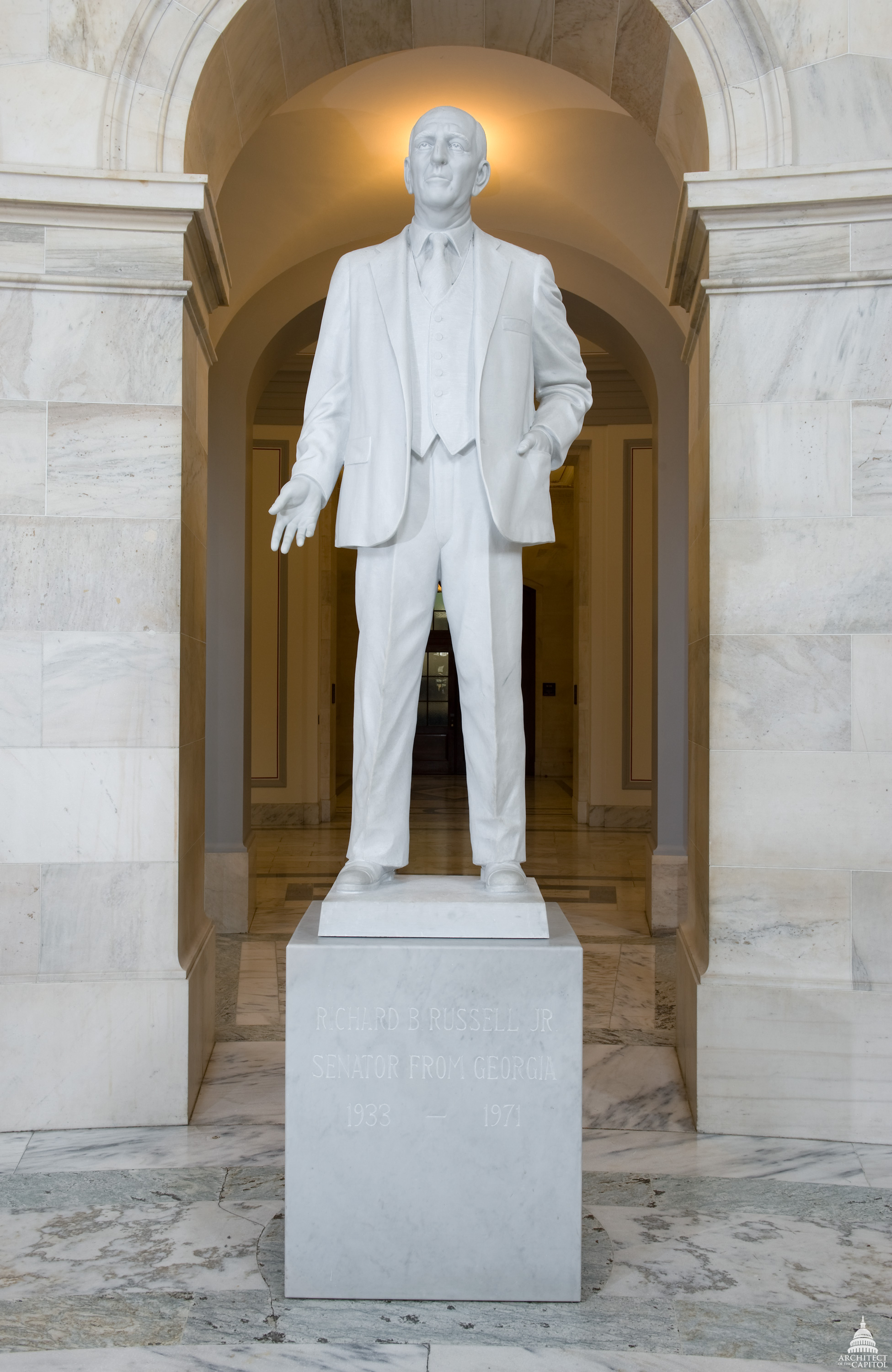
Richard B. Russell – Russell Senate Office Building, Washington, D.C.

== Bibliography ==
- Frederick Hart: Sculptor (Hudson Hills Press, 1995) ISBN 1-55595-120-1
- Frederick Hart: Changing Tides (Hudson Hills Press, 2005) ISBN 978-1-55595-233-4
- Frederick Hart: The Complete Works (Butler Books, 2007) ISBN 1-884532-85-3
