= Vietnam Veterans Memorial =

US national memorial in Washington, D.C.

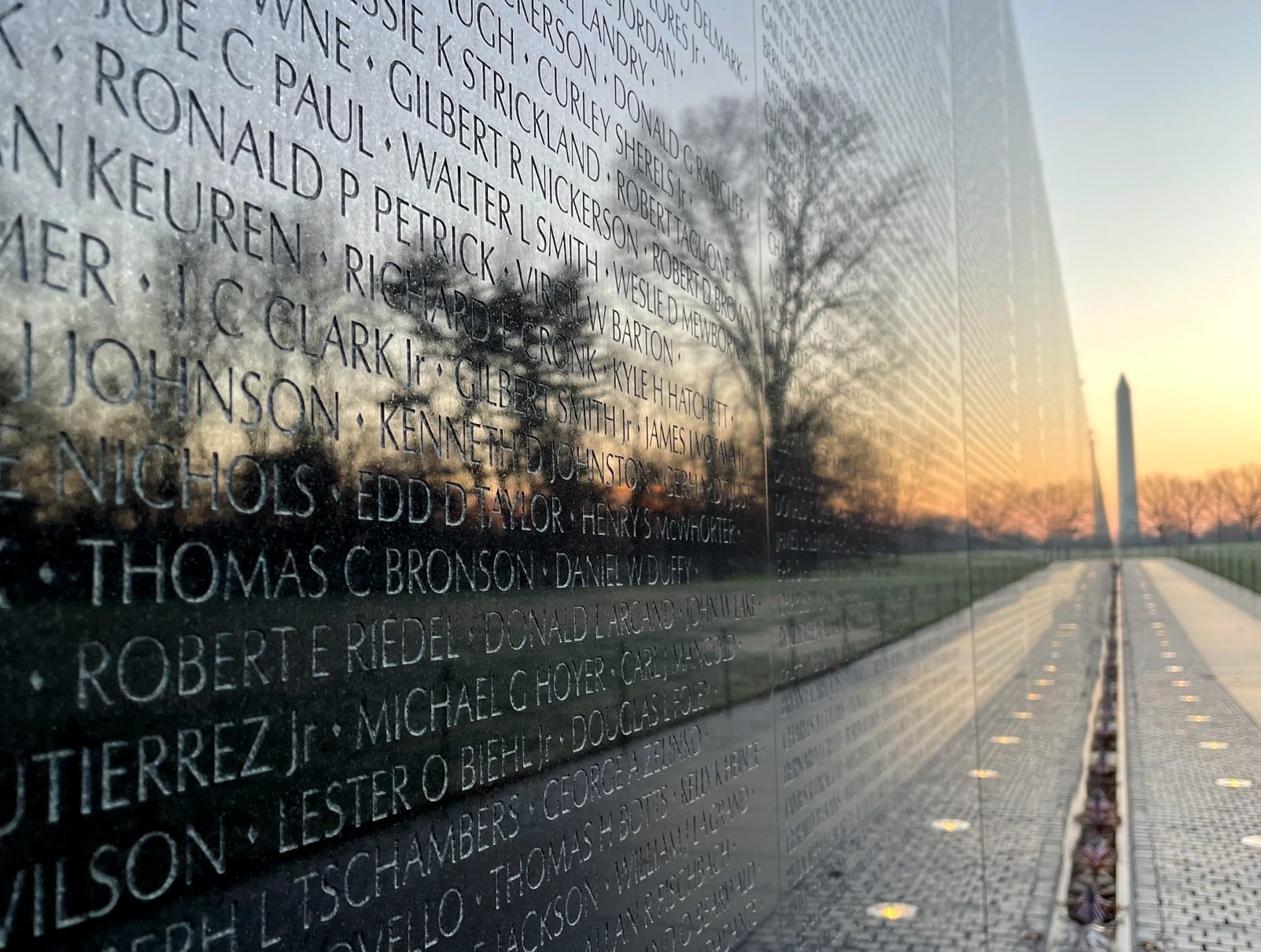
- Vietnam Veterans Memorial wall in 2022

- Location within Central Washington, D.C. Location within the United States
- Location: Washington, D.C., U.S.
- Coordinates: 38°53′28″N 77°2′52″W
- Area: 2 acres (0.81 ha)
- Established: November 13, 1982
- Visitors: 4,848,112 (in 2025)
- Governing body: National Park Service
- Website: nps.gov/vive
- Vietnam Veterans Memorial
- U.S. National Register of Historic Places
- U.S. National Memorial
- Architect: Maya Lin
- NRHP reference No.: 01000285
- Added to NRHP: November 13, 1982

The Vietnam Veterans Memorial, commonly called the Vietnam Memorial, is a U.S. national memorial in Washington, D.C., honoring service members of the United States Armed Forces who served in the Vietnam War. The two-acre (8,100 m^{2}) site is dominated by two black granite walls engraved with the names of those service members who died or remain missing as a result of their service in Vietnam and South East Asia during the war. The Memorial Wall was designed by American architect Maya Lin and is an example of minimalist architecture. The Wall, completed in 1982, has since been supplemented with the statue Three Soldiers in 1984 and the Vietnam Women's Memorial in 1993.

The memorial is in Constitution Gardens, adjacent to the National Mall and just northeast of the Lincoln Memorial. It is maintained by the National Park Service and receives around three million visitors each year. It was initially controversial for its lack of heroic ornamentation and iconography, but its reputation improved over time. In 2007, it was ranked tenth on the "List of America's Favorite Architecture" by the American Institute of Architects. As a national memorial, it is listed on the National Register of Historic Places.

== Appearance ==
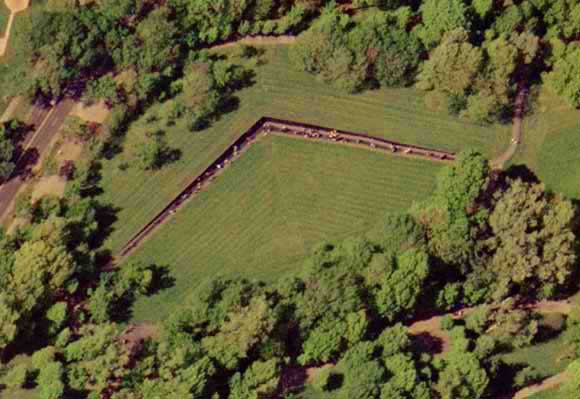
An aerial photograph of The Wall taken on April 26, 2002, by the United States Geological Survey. The dots visible along the length of the angled wall are visitors. For a satellite view of the Wall in relation to other monuments, see Constitution Gardens.

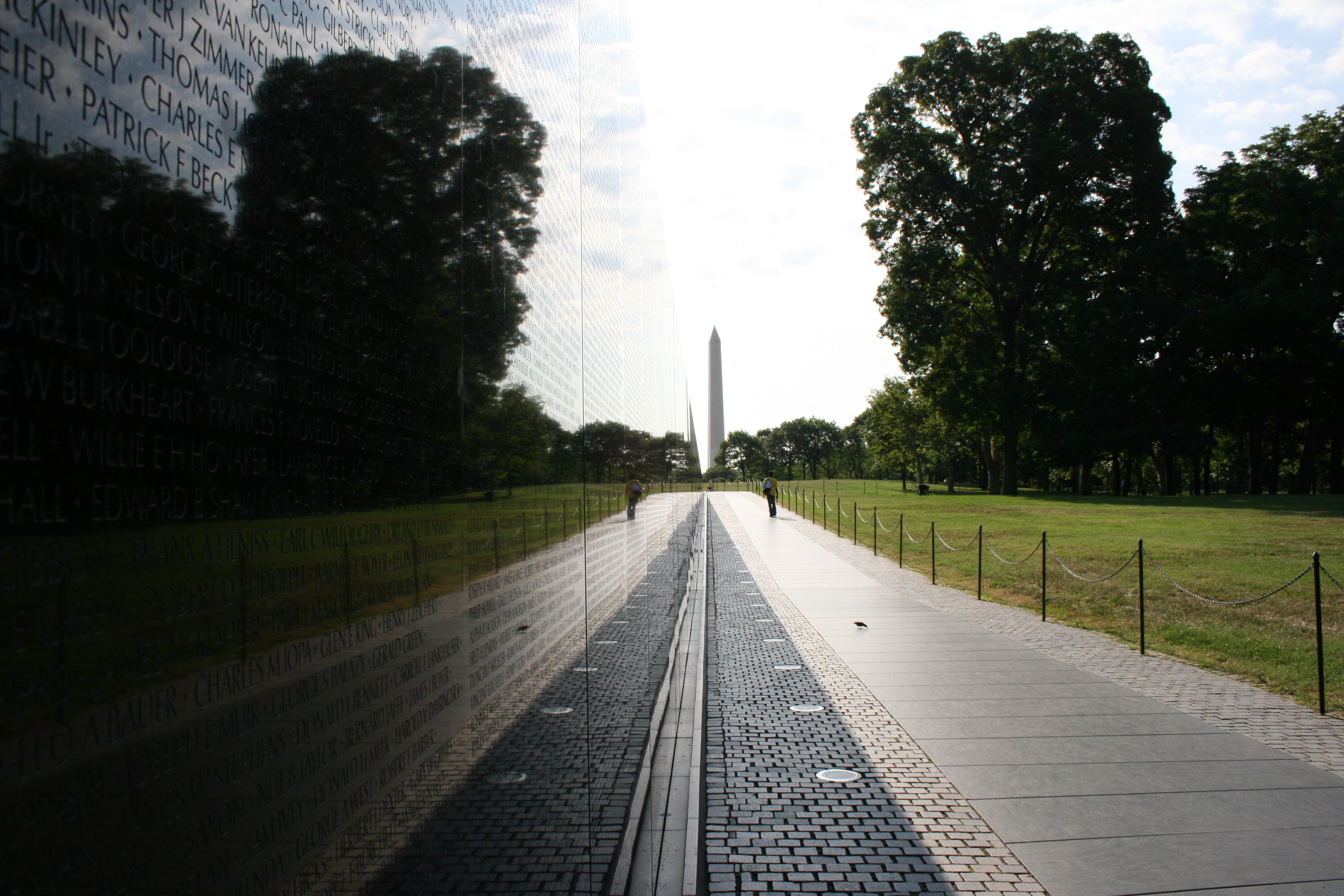
The monument's eastern portion points towards the Washington Monument

=== Memorial Wall ===
The memorial is composed of two adjoining walls. Each wall is 246 feet 9 inches (75.21 m) long and is composed of 72 black granite panels that are polished to a high finish. Seventy of the panels on each wall are inscribed with the names of the men and women being honored. The walls taper from 8 inches (200 mm) tall at their extremities to 10.1 feet (3.1 m) tall at the apex where they meet, their bottom edges descending below the level of the surrounding earth while their top edges stay level. As such, visitors walking the length of the memorial start at ground level, descend below it, and ascend back to ground level. This is symbolic of a "wound that is closed and healing" and exemplifies the land art movement of the 1960s, which produced sculptures that sought to reconnect with the natural environment. The stone for the 144 panels was quarried in Bangalore, India.

One wall points to the Washington Monument, the other to the Lincoln Memorial, meeting at an angle of 125° 12′. Each wall has 72 panels, 70 listing names (numbered 1E through 70E and 70W through 1W), and two very small blank panels at the extremities. A pathway for visitors extends along the base of the Wall.

The names on the Wall, originally numbering 57,939 when it was dedicated in 1982, are listed in the chronological order of the dates of casualty. Additional names have been added throughout the years since: as of May 2018 there were 58,320 names. The number of names on the wall differs from other counts of U.S. Vietnam War deaths. Directories of the names and their locations are located on nearby podiums at both ends of the Memorial.

The memorial has had some unforeseen maintenance issues. In 1984, cracks were detected in the granite and, as a result, two of the panels were temporarily removed in 1986 for study. More cracks were later discovered in 2010. There are a number of hypotheses about the cause of the cracks, the most common being due to thermal cycling. In 1990, the Vietnam Veterans Memorial Fund purchased several blank panels to use in case any were ever damaged; these were placed into storage at Quantico Marine Base. Two of the blank panels were shattered by the 2011 Virginia earthquake.

==== Names ====
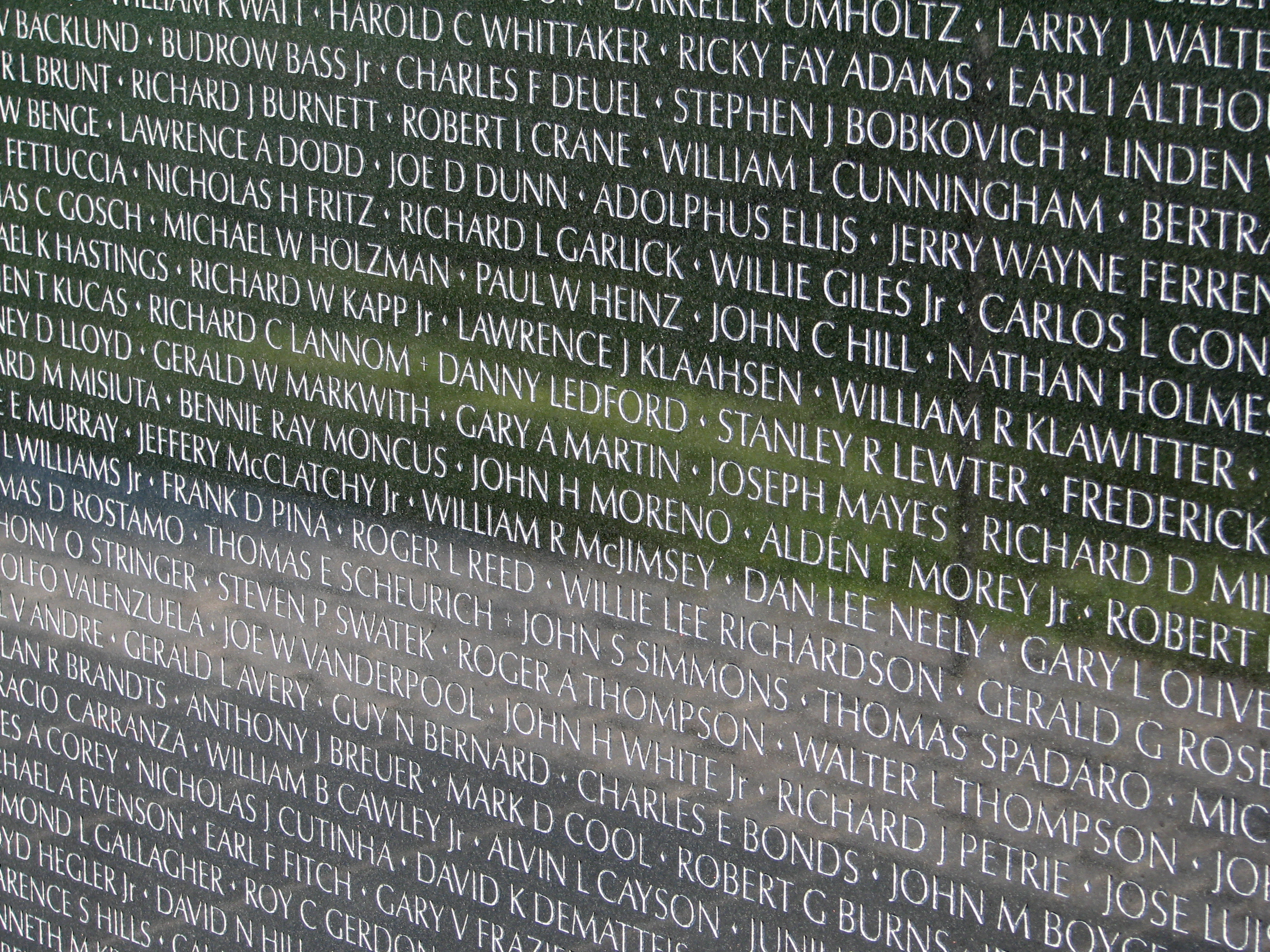
One panel of The Wall, displaying some of the names of fallen U.S. service members from the Vietnam War

Inscribed on the Memorial are the names of service members who were classified as dead, missing, or prisoner. The list includes names of individuals who died due to circumstances other than killed in action, including murder, vehicle accidents, drowning, heart attack, animal attack, snake bites and others. The names are inscribed in Optima typeface, designed by Hermann Zapf. Information about rank, unit, or decorations is not provided on the Wall itself.

Those who were confirmed as dead are denoted by a diamond shape next to the name, and those who are status unknown are denoted with a "cross" sign. When the death of one who was previously missing is confirmed, a diamond is superimposed over the cross. If a missing man were to return alive, which has never occurred to date, the cross is to be circumscribed by a circle.

The earliest date of eligibility for a name to be included on the Memorial is November 1, 1955, which corresponds to when President Eisenhower deployed the Military Assistance Advisory Group to train the Army of the Republic of Vietnam. The last date of eligibility is May 15, 1975, which corresponds to the final day of the Mayaguez incident. The names are listed in chronological order, starting at the apex on panel 1E on July 8, 1959, moving day by day to the end of the eastern wall at panel 70E, which ended on May 25, 1968, starting again at panel 70W at the end of the western wall, completing the list for May 25, 1968, and returning to the apex at panel 1W in 1975. There are some deaths that predate July 8, 1959, including the death of Richard B. Fitzgibbon Jr. in 1956.

There are circumstances that allow for a name to be added to the Memorial, but the death must be directly attributed to a wound received within the combat zone while on active duty. The determination of addition is made by the Department of Defense. In these cases, the name is added according to the date of injury—not the date of death.

The names of 32 men were erroneously included in the memorial, and while those names remain on the wall, they have been removed from the databases and printed directories. The extra names resulted from a deliberate decision to err on the side of inclusiveness, with 38 questionable names being included. One person, whose name was added as late as 1992, had gone AWOL immediately upon his return to the United States after his second completed tour of duty. His survival only came to the attention of government authorities in 1996.

There are eight women's names included in the memorial—Eleanor Grace Alexander, Pamela Dorothy Donovan, Carol Ann Drazba, Annie Ruth Graham, Elizabeth Ann Jones, Mary Therese Klinker, Sharon Ann Lane, and Hedwig Diane Orlowski. All were nurses.

=== Three Servicemen ===
A component of the Memorial, located a few feet away from the Wall, is a bronze statue named Three Servicemen (sometimes called Three Soldiers) created by Frederick E Hart. The work depicts three soldiers. Two are purposefully identifiable as European American and African American, while the third is intended to represent all other ethnic groups in America. In their final arrangement, the statue and the Wall appear to interact with one another, with the soldiers looking on in solemn tribute at the names of their fallen comrades. The distance between the two allows them to interact without affecting the design of the other. The Three Servicemen was not part of Maya Lin's original design and was added two years later in response to veteran support.

=== Vietnam Women's Memorial ===
The Vietnam Women's Memorial is dedicated to the women of the United States who served in the Vietnam War, most of whom were nurses. It serves as a reminder of the importance of women in the conflict. It depicts three uniformed women with a wounded soldier. It is located on the National Mall in Washington, D.C., a short distance south of The Wall, north of the Reflecting Pool. It was authorized by separate legislation from that of the Vietnam Veterans Memorial.

=== In Memory memorial plaque ===
A memorial plaque, authorized by an Act of Congress (Pub. L. 106–214 (text) (PDF)), was dedicated on November 10, 2004, at the northeast corner of the plaza surrounding the Three Soldiers statue to honor veterans who died after the war as a result of injuries suffered in Vietnam, but who fall outside Department of Defense guidelines. The plaque is a carved block of black granite, 3 by 2 feet (0.91 by 0.61 m), inscribed "In memory of the men and women who served in the Vietnam War and later died as a result of their service. We honor and remember their sacrifice."

Ruth Coder Fitzgerald, the founder of The Vietnam War In Memory Memorial Plaque Project, worked for years to have the In Memory Memorial Plaque completed. The organization has been dissolved, but its web site is maintained by the Vietnam War Project at Texas Tech University.

== Ritual ==
Visitors to the memorial began leaving sentimental items at the memorial at its opening. They continue leaving objects forty years after the dedication of the memorial. One story claims this practice began during construction when a Vietnam veteran threw the Purple Heart his brother received posthumously into the concrete of the memorial's foundation. Several thousand items are left at the memorial each year. The largest item left at the memorial was a sliding glass storm door with a full-size replica "tiger cage". The door was painted with a scene from Vietnam and the names of U.S. POWs and MIAs from the conflict.

== History ==
Vietnam Veterans Memorial
- Long title: A joint resolution to authorize the Vietnam Veterans Memorial Fund, Inc., to erect a memorial.
- Enacted by: the 96th United States Congress
- Effective: July 1, 1980

Citations
- Public law: Pub. L. 96–297
- Statutes at Large: 94 Stat. 827

Legislative history
- Introduced in the Senate as S.J. Res. 119 by Charles Mathias (R–MD) on November 8, 1979; Committee consideration by Senate Energy and Natural Resources; Passed the Senate on April 30, 1980; Passed the House on May 20, 1980; Reported by the joint conference committee on June 25, 1980; agreed to by the House on June 27, 1980 (unanimous consent) and by the Senate on June 30, 1980; Signed into law by President Jimmy Carter on July 1, 1980

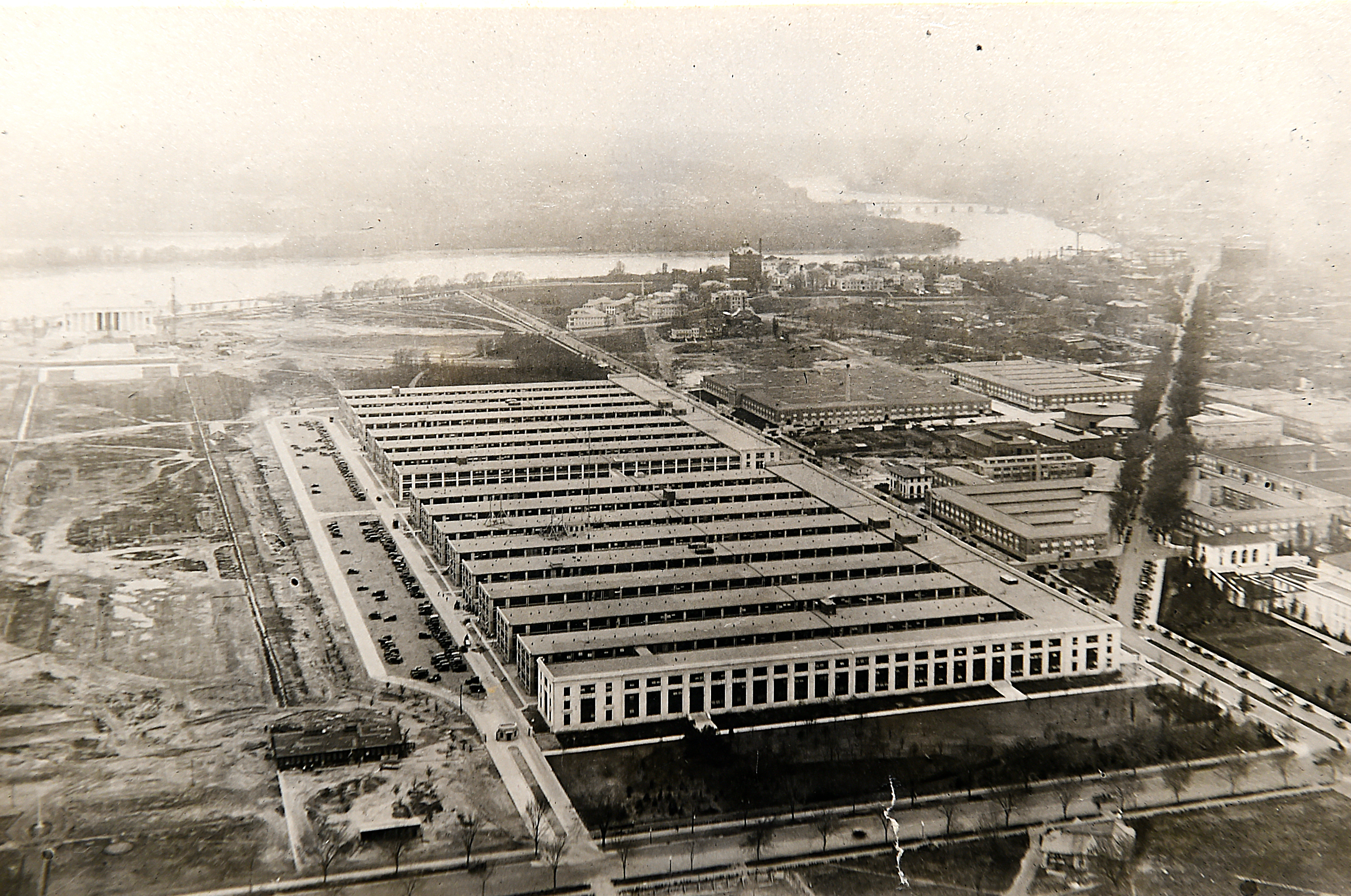
The Main Navy and Munitions Building site, with the Munitions buildings behind the Navy building

On April 27, 1979, four years after the fall of Saigon, the Vietnam Veterans Memorial Fund, Inc. (VVMF) was incorporated as a non-profit organization to establish a memorial to honor the veterans of the Vietnam War. The impetus for the founding of VVMF fund came from a wounded Vietnam War veteran, Jan Scruggs, who was inspired by the film The Deer Hunter. VVMF was joined by a volunteer cadre of Vietnam veterans, primarily former junior officers and enlisted men, among whom two emerged as principal leaders with Scruggs: West Point graduate John P. Wheeler III and Robert W. Doubek, a former Air Force intelligence officer. As the campaign expanded, fundraiser Sandie Fauriol joined the organization as director of development and helped professionalize its fundraising operations. Wheeler and Fauriol later founded the Project on the Vietnam Generation, a Washington-based organization devoted to research and public discussion of the legacy of the Vietnam era. In recognition of their leadership, Scruggs, Wheeler, and Doubek were nominated for the Congressional Gold Medal in 1986. Eventually, $8.4 million was raised through private donations.

On July 1, 1980, a site consisting of two acres next to the Lincoln Memorial was chosen and authorized by Congress. The World War I Munitions Building previously occupied that area. VVMF decided to choose a design for the Memorial through a national design competition, with a first prize of $20,000. The competition was open to any American over 18 years of age, and by the end of the year 1980, 2,573 individuals and teams had registered for the competition, and by the deadline of March 30, 1981, 1,421 designs were submitted. The designs were displayed at an airport hangar at Andrews Air Force Base for the selection jury, in rows covering more than 35,000 square feet (3,300 m^{2}) of floor space. Each entry was identified by number only. All entries were examined by each juror; the entries were narrowed down to 232, then to 39. Finally, the jury selected entry number 1026, which had been designed by Maya Lin.

=== Opposition to design and compromise ===
The selected design was controversial, in particular due to its black color, its lack of ornamentation, and its configuration below ground level. Among other attacks, it was called "a black gash of shame and sorrow." Two prominent early supporters of the project, Ross Perot and James Webb, withdrew their support once they saw the design. Webb said, "I never in my wildest dreams imagined such a nihilistic slab of stone." James Watt, secretary of the interior under President Ronald Reagan, delayed issuing a building permit for the Memorial due to the political opposition. Since its early years, criticism of the Memorial's design faded. In the words of Scruggs, "It has become something of a shrine."

Negative reactions to Maya Lin's design created a controversy; a compromise was reached by VVMF's agreement to add a flagstaff and a realist statue at the site. Consequently Frederick Hart (who designed the sculpture that was part of the third-place winner in the original design competition) was commissioned to produce a bronze figurative sculpture. Opponents of Lin's design wanted to place this sculpture of three soldiers at the apex of the two walls, to make the soldiers the focal point of the memorial and the Wall a mere backdrop. In the end, the sculpture was placed in an entry plaza. On October 13, 1982, the U.S. Commission of Fine Arts approved the addition of the flagstaff and the Hart sculptures. The statue Three Soldiers was dedicated in 1984.

=== Building the memorial ===
On March 11, 1982, the revised design was formally approved, and on March 26, 1982, ground was formally broken. Stone from Bangalore, India, mined in Chamarajanagar India was chosen because of its reflective quality; Cutting and fabrication of the panels were done in Barre, Vermont. The panels were then shipped to Memphis, Tennessee, where the names were inscribed. The inscriptions were done with a photoemulsion and sandblasting process. Typesetting of the original 57,939 names on the wall was performed by Datalantic in Atlanta, Georgia. The negatives used in the process are in storage at the Smithsonian Institution.

The memorial was dedicated on November 13, 1982, as part of a five-day ceremony that began on November 10, 1982, called the "National Salute to Vietnam Veterans," which included a reading of names at the National Cathedral, unit reunions, an entertainers' show, a parade, the Memorial's dedication, and a service at the cathedral.

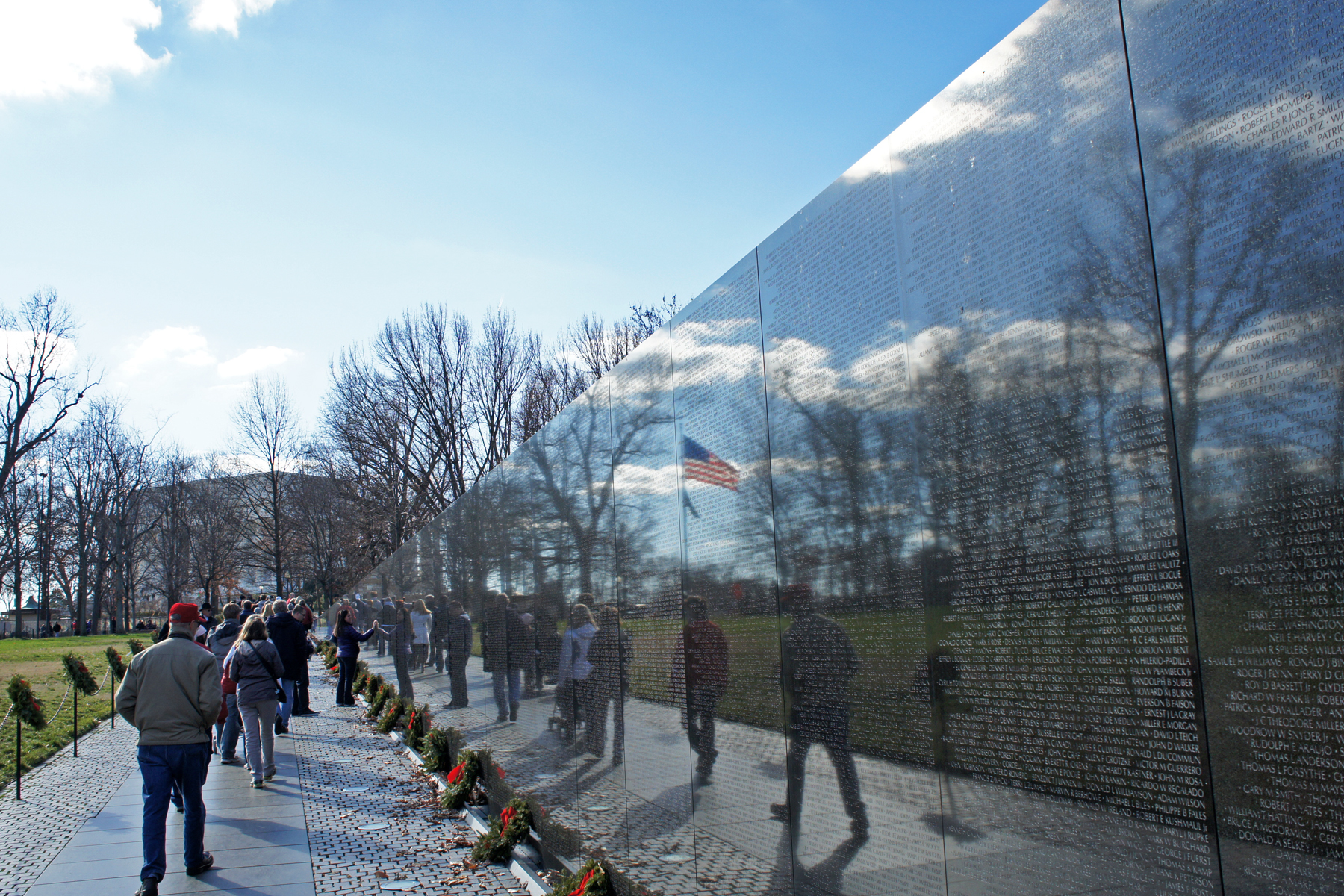
Vietnam Veterans Memorial Wall with Christmas ornaments

==== Timeline for those listed on the wall ====
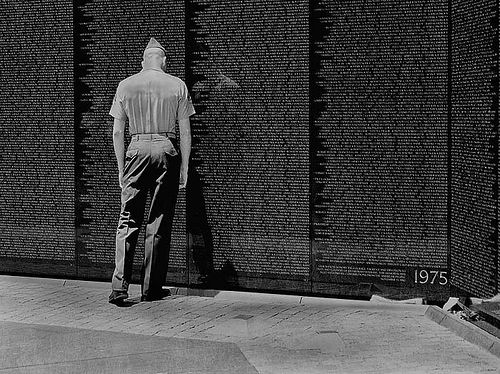
A U.S. Marine at Vietnam Veterans Memorial on July 4, 2002

- November 1, 1955 – Dwight D. Eisenhower deployed the Military Assistance Advisory Group, referred to now as MAAG, to train the South Vietnamese military units and secret police. However, the U.S. Department of Defense does not recognize this date since the men were supposedly training only the Vietnamese, so the officially recognized date is the formation of the Military Assistance Command Viet Nam, better known as MACV. This marked the official beginning of American involvement in the war as recognized by the memorial.
- June 8, 1956 – The first official death in Vietnam was Technical Sergeant Richard Bernard Fitzgibbon Jr., United States Air Force, of Stoneham, Massachusetts, who was murdered by another U.S.A.F. airman.
- October 21, 1957 – Capt. Harry Griffith Cramer Jr., a graduate of the United States Military Academy at West Point, was killed near Nha Trang, Vietnam. He served in Korea, where he was injured and awarded the Purple Heart, as well as in Vietnam. He was the first US Army soldier to be killed in the line of duty in the Vietnam War. A street at Fort Lewis, Washington, is named in his honor. He is buried at the United States Military Academy, West Point, New York.
- July 8, 1959 – Chester M. Ovnand and Dale R. Buis were killed by guerrillas at Bien Hoa while watching the film The Tattered Dress. They are listed Nos. 1 and 2 at the wall's dedication. Ovnand's name is spelled on the memorial as "Ovnard," due to conflicting military records of his surname.
- April 30, 1975 – Fall of Saigon. The U.S. Department of Veterans Affairs uses May 7, 1975, as the official end date for the Vietnam War era as defined by 38 U.S.C. § 101.
- May 15, 1975 – 18 U.S. servicemen (14 Marines, two Navy corpsmen, and two Air Force crewmen) are killed on the last day of a rescue operation known as the Mayaguez incident with troops from the Khmer Rouge in Cambodia. They are the last servicemen listed on the timeline.

Since 1982, over 400 names have been added to the memorial, but not necessarily in chronological order. Some were men who died in Vietnam but were left off the list due to clerical errors. Others died after 1982, and their deaths were determined by the Department of Defense to be the direct result of their Vietnam War service. For those who died during the war, their name is placed in a position that relates to their date of death. For those who died after the war, their name is placed in a position that relates to the date of their injury. Because space is usually not available in the exact right place, names are placed as close to their correct chronological position as possible, but usually not in the exact spot. The order could be corrected as panels are replaced.

Furthermore, over 100 names have been identified as misspelled. In some cases, the correction could be done in place. In others, the name had to be chiseled again elsewhere, moving them out of chronological order. Others have remained in place, with the misspelling, at the request of their family.

=== Addition of the Women's Memorial ===
The Women's Memorial was designed by Glenna Goodacre for the women of the United States who served in the Vietnam War. Before Goodacre's design was selected, two design entries had been awarded as co-finalists – one a statue and the other a setting – however, the two designs were unable to be reconciled. Glenna Goodacre's entry received an honorable mention in the contest and she was asked to submit a modified maquette (design model). Goodacre's original design for the Women's Memorial statue included a standing figure of a nurse holding a Vietnamese baby, which although not intended as such, was deemed a political statement, and it was asked that this be removed. She replaced them with a figure of a kneeling woman holding an empty helmet. On November 11, 1993, the Vietnam Women's Memorial was dedicated. There is a smaller replica of that memorial at Vietnam Veterans Memorial State Park in Angel Fire, New Mexico.

=== Education center ===
In 2003, after some years of lobbying, the National Park Service and the Vietnam Veterans Memorial Fund won permission from Congress to build The Education Center at The Wall. A 37,000-square-foot (3,400 m^{2}) two-story museum, located below ground just west of the Maya Lin-designed memorial, was proposed to display the history of the Vietnam War and the multiple design competitions and artworks which make up the Vietnam Veterans Memorial, Vietnam Women's Memorial, and the Memorial Plaque. The center would have also provided biographical details on and photographs of many of the 58,000 names listed on the Wall as well as the more than 6,600 servicemembers killed since 2001 fighting the war on terror. The $115-million museum would be jointly operated by the Park Service and the Fund. A ceremonial groundbreaking for the project occurred in November 2012, but insufficient fundraising led the Fund to cancel construction of the center in September 2018 and instead focus on digital education and outreach.

== Vietnam Veterans Memorial Collection ==
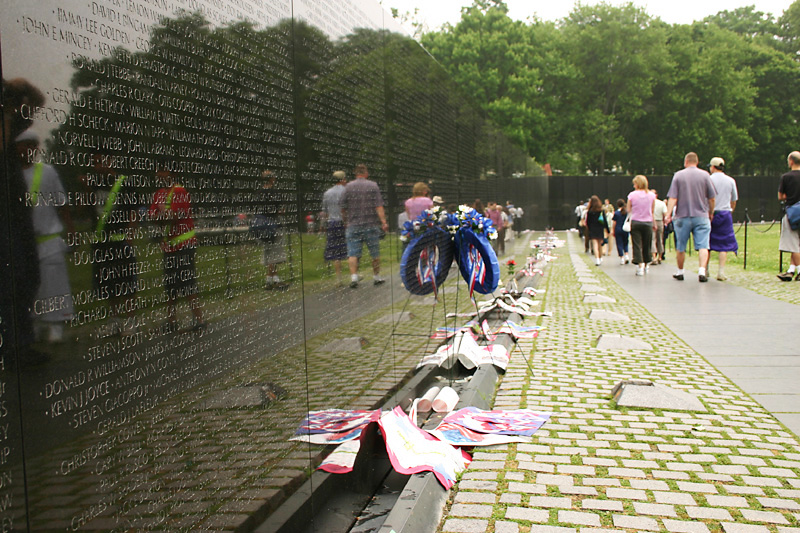
Various items left at "The Wall".

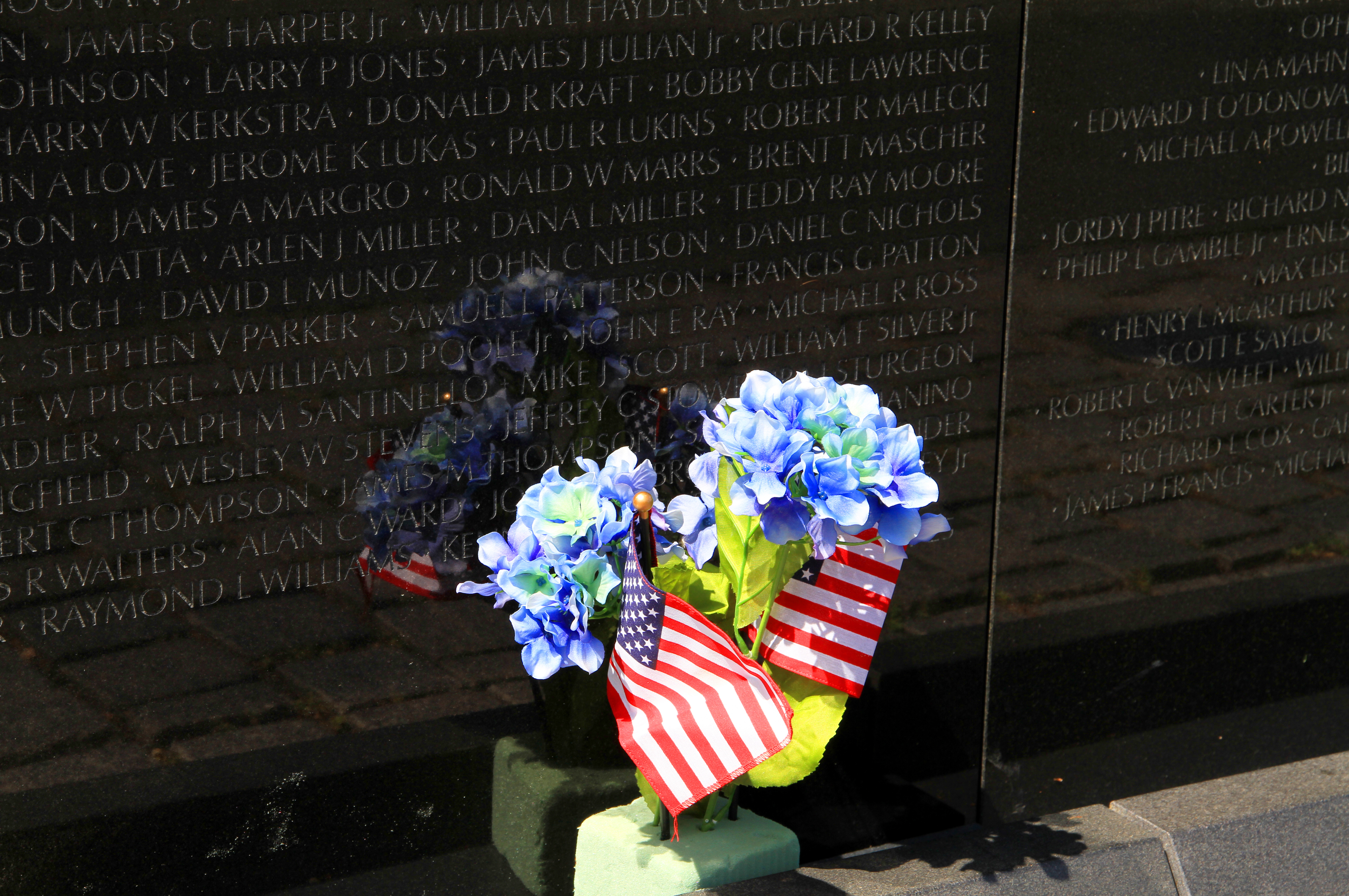
Flags and flowers

Items left at the Vietnam Veterans Memorial are collected by National Park Service employees and transferred to the NPS Museum Resource Center, which catalogs and stores all items except perishable organic matter (such as fresh flowers) and unaltered U.S. flags. The flags are redistributed through various channels.

From 1992 to 2003, selected items from the collection were placed on exhibit at the Smithsonian Institution's National Museum of American History as "Personal Legacy: The Healing of a Nation" including the Medal of Honor of Charles Liteky, who renounced it in 1986 by placing the medal at the memorial in an envelope addressed to then-president Ronald Reagan.

== Inspired works ==
=== Traveling replicas ===
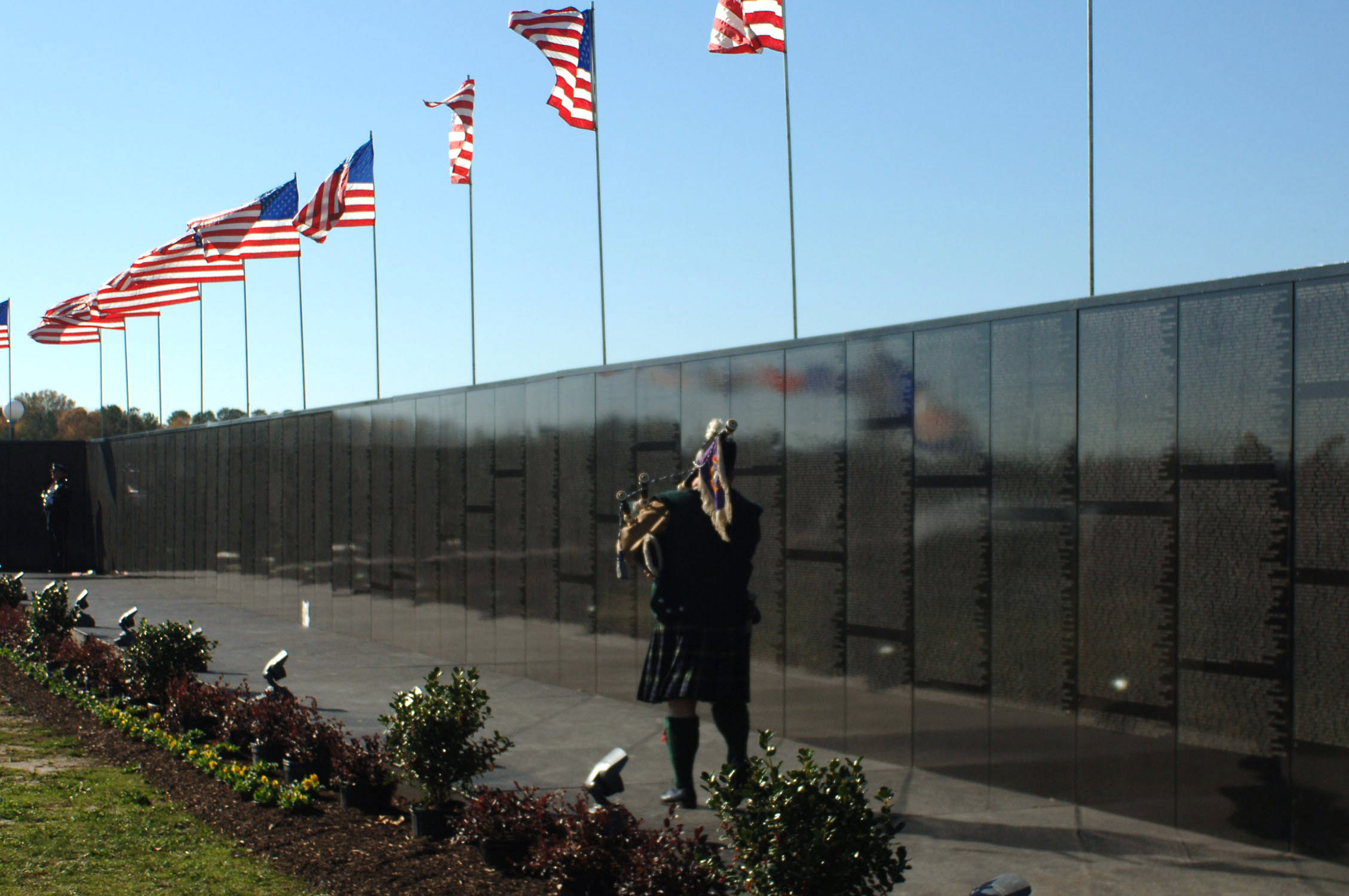
The Moving Wall at Mount Trashmore Park in Virginia

There are several transportable replicas of the Vietnam Veteran's Memorial created so those who are not able to travel to Washington, D.C., would be able to simulate an experience of visiting the Wall.

- Using personal finances, John Devitt founded Vietnam Combat Veterans, Ltd. With the help of friends, the half-size replica of the Vietnam Veterans Memorial, named The Moving Wall, was built and first put on display to the public in Tyler, Texas, in 1984. The Moving Wall visits hundreds of small towns and cities throughout the U.S., staying five or six days at each site. Local arrangements for each visit are made months in advance by veterans' organizations and other civic groups. The desire for a hometown visit of The Moving Wall was so high that the waiting list became very long. Vietnam Combat Veterans built a second structure of The Moving Wall. A third structure was added in 1989. In 2001, one of the structures was retired due to wear. By 2006, there had been more than 1,000 hometown visits of The Moving Wall. The count of people who visited The Moving Wall at each display ranges from 5,000 to more than 50,000; the total estimate of visitors is in the tens of millions. As the wall moves from town to town on interstates, it is often escorted by state troopers and up to thousands of local citizens on motorcycles. Many of these are Patriot Guard Riders, who consider escorting The Moving Wall to be a "special mission", which is coordinated on their website. As it passes towns, even when it is not planning a stop in those towns, local veterans organizations sometimes plan for local citizens to gather by the highway and across overpasses to wave flags and salute the Wall. The first Moving Wall structure to retire has been on permanent display at the Veterans Memorial Amphitheater in Pittsburg, Kansas since 2004. The Memorial is open to the public with no admission fee, 24 hours a day, year-round.

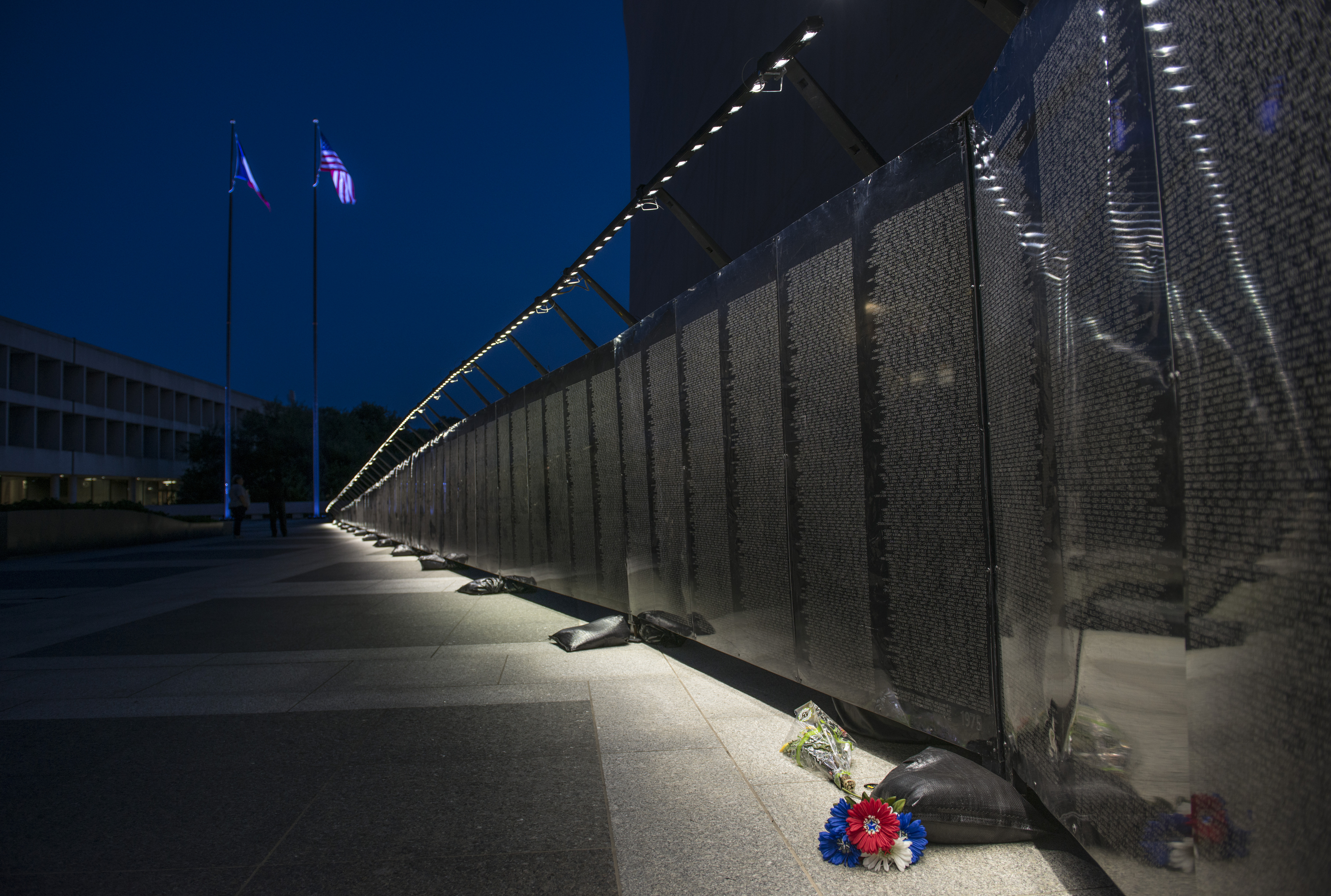
The Wall That Heals at the LBJ Presidential Library in 2016

- Duluth, Minnesota, holds the Northland Vietnam Veterans Memorial, a site that was dedicated on May 30, 1992.
- The Wall That Heals is a traveling three-quarter scale replica of the Vietnam Veterans Memorial started in 1996 by the Vietnam Veterans Memorial Fund. A 53-foot (16 m) tractor-trailer transports the 375-foot (114 m) wall replica and converts to a mobile Education Center at each stop, showing letters and memorabilia left at The Wall in Washington, D.C., and more details about those whose names are shown. An earlier half-scale 250-foot (76 m) replica has been retired to permanent display in front of the James E. Van Zandt VA Medical Center in Altoona, PA.
- Created by the American Veterans Traveling Tribute, The Traveling Wall is an 80% replica Vietnam Veterans Memorial Wall and is 360 feet (110 m) long and 8 feet (2.4 m) tall at its apex. It claims to be the largest traveling replica.
- Created by Vietnam and All Veterans of Brevard, Inc, The Vietnam Traveling Memorial Wall is a 3/5 scale of the Vietnam Veterans Memorial and is almost 300 feet (91 m) long and 6 feet (1.8 m) tall at the center.
- Created by Dignity Memorial, the Dignity Memorial Vietnam Wall is 3/4 scale of the Vietnam Veterans Memorial.

=== Fixed replicas ===
Located at 200 S. 9th Ave in Pensacola, Florida, the first permanent replica of the National Vietnam Veterans Memorial was unveiled on October 24, 1992. Now known as "Wall South," the half-size replica bears the names of all Americans killed or missing in Southeast Asia and is updated each Mother's Day. It is the centerpiece of Veterans Memorial Park Pensacola, a 5 1/2-acre site overlooking Pensacola Bay, which also includes a World War I Memorial, a World War II Memorial, a Korean War Memorial, a Revolutionary War Memorial and a running series of plaques to honor local casualties from the Global War on Terror. There is also a Purple Heart Memorial, a Marine Corps Aviation Bell Tower and a monument to the submarine lifeguards who rescued Navy pilots in World War II. A Global War on Terror Memorial is planned to be completed in 2017 and will include an artifact from the World Trade Center as a component of the sculpture.

Located in Fox Park in Wildwood, New Jersey, The Wildwoods Vietnam Veterans Memorial Wall was unveiled and dedicated on May 29, 2010. The memorial wall is an almost half-size granite replica of the National Vietnam Veterans Memorial and the only permanent memorial north of the nation's capital.

Plans for the Vietnam War Memorial located 401 East Ninth Street in Winfield, Kansas began in 1987 when friends who had gathered for a class reunion wanted to find a way to honor their fallen classmates. The project quickly grew from honoring only Cowley County servicemen to representing all 777 servicemen and nurses from Kansas who lost their lives or are missing in action from the Vietnam War.

Located at Freedom Park in South Sioux City, Nebraska exists a half-scale replica of the Vietnam Veterans Memorial wall that duplicates the original design. Dedicated in 2014, the 250-foot wall is constructed with black granite mined from the same quarry in India as the original.

Located in Layton, Utah, the Layton Vietnam Memorial Wall at 437 N Wasatch Dr, 84041, contains the names of all 58,000 Americans who died in the war. According to Utah Vietnam Veterans of America, the wall is 80 percent of the original size of the memorial in Washington, D.C., and it is the only replica of its size west of the Mississippi. The memorial was officially opened and dedicated on July 14, 2018.

Located in Elizabethtown, Kentucky, opened in 2018. This Vietnam Veteran's Memorial Wall is 360 feet long, an 80 percent scale of the one in Washington D.C.

Missouri's National Veterans Memorial was opened in May 2019 and is located about 1 hour south of St. Louis, Missouri in Perryville, Missouri. It features an exact full-sized replica of the Vietnam Veterans Memorial.

Located in Augusta, Georgia, opened in 2019, the Augusta-CSRA Vietnam War Veterans Memorial is not a replica but follows the principles set forth by the national monument of honoring those fallen in Vietnam with inscriptions of the names, 169 total, who made the supreme sacrifice in Vietnam.

=== As a memorial genre ===
The first US memorial to an ongoing war, the Northwood Gratitude and Honor Memorial in Irvine, California, is modeled on the Vietnam Veterans Memorial in that it includes a chronological list of the dead engraved in dark granite. As the memorialized wars (in Iraq and Afghanistan) have not concluded, the Northwood Gratitude and Honor Memorial will be updated yearly. It has space for about 8000 names, of which 5,714 were engraved as of the Dedication of the Memorial on November 14, 2010.

== Cultural representations ==
The Vietnam Veteran's Memorial Wall inspired over 60 songs, identified by the Vietnam War Song Project, showing how the war has been represented in subsequent decades, performed by professional musicians and Vietnam veterans. The songs present patriotic tributes to the names on the Wall, the perspective of families and friends, as well as recriminations and anti-war sentiment. One of the first songs released on record was "The Wall" by Britt Small & Festival, who performed the song at the memorial in November 1982, and subsequently released as a 7" single. This was followed by "Who are the names on the Wall?", by Vietnam veterans Michael J. Martin and Tim Holiday, also released in 1982. In 1983, contemporary folk artist Michael Jerling released "Long Black Wall" on the "CooP Fast Folk Musical Magazine (Vol. 2, No. 4) – Political Song", published by Fast Folk. Commercially successful songs include: "More Than a Name on the Wall" (1989) by The Statler Brothers, which peaked at #6 on the Billboard Hot Country Singles chart; "The Big Parade" (1989) by 10,000 Maniacs on the album Blind Man's Zoo, which reached #13 in the US Billboard chart; Guns N' Roses song "Civil War" (1991), which referenced the memorial, and reaching #4 in the US Billboard rock charts.

== Vandalism ==
There have been hundreds of incidents of vandalism at the memorial wall. Some of the most notable cases are:

- In April 1988, when a swastika and various scratches were found etched in two of the panels.
- In 1993, someone burned one of the directory stands at the entrance to the memorial.
- On September 7, 2007, an oily substance was found by park rangers on the memorial's wall panels and paving stones. It was spread over an area of 50–60 feet (15–18 m). Memorial Fund founder Jan Scruggs deplored the scene, calling it an "act of vandalism on one of America's sacred places". The removal process took a few weeks to complete.

== See also ==
- List of public art in Washington, D.C., Ward 2
- List of Vietnam War memorials
- List of national memorials of the United States
- Northwood Gratitude and Honor Memorial
- Vietnam Forces National Memorial, Canberra
- Vietnam Veterans of America, chartered by Congress and campaigns on issues important to Vietnam veterans
- Vietnam War Memorial, Hanoi
- The Virtual Wall, an online memorial
- The Wall That Heals, a 1997 film
- Architecture of Washington, D.C.
