= Blue Gum Park =

Blue Gum Park may refer to:

- Blue Gum Park, Adelaide Park Lands, South Australia
- Blue Gum Park, Irvine, California
