= Wickham Park (Melbourne, Florida) =

Park in Melbourne, Florida, United States

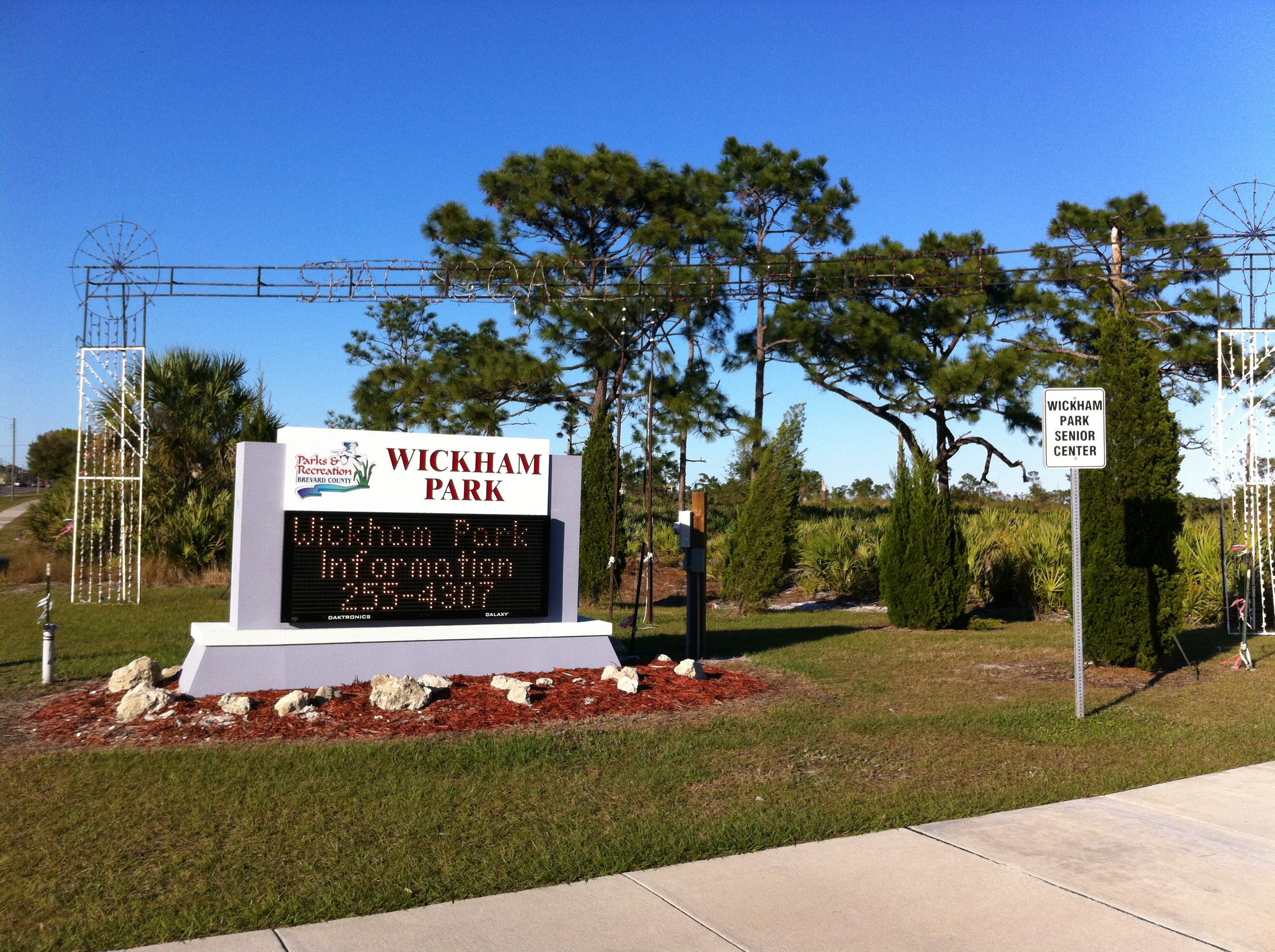
- Wickham Road entrance
- Interactive map of Wickham Park
- Type: Public park
- Location: 2500 Parkway Drive; Melbourne, Florida
- Coordinates: 28.1585°N 80.66211°W
- Area: 391.04 acres (158.25 ha)
- Operator: Brevard County
- Status: Open all year

Wickham Park is a public county park located at 2500 Parkway Drive, Melbourne, Florida. It contains diverse recreational facilities and amenities, including campgrounds, disc golf course, equestrian facilities, archery range, off-leash dog park, bicycle/jogging roadway, nature trails, exercise trails, ball fields, an event pavilion, picnic pavilions, playground, and swimming lakes. It has the Wickham Park Community Center at 2815 Leisure Way.

== Events ==
Archery lessons and 3D archery competitions are hosted monthly. Target and field archery shoots are held nearly every other month.

Several annual events are held. In the past, these have included the Space Coast Lightfest, Oktoberfest, the Vietnam Veterans Memorial, Indiafest, Renaissance Fair, and the Strawberry Festival to benefit Habitat for Humanity.

In 2009, 19,000 people attended the County Fair over a ten-day period.

Runaway Country was held at Wickham Park up until 2015. Performers such as Alan Jackson, Miranda Lambert, Randy Travis, Big & Rich, and Kellie Pickler have played at this outdoor country music festival. There were an estimated 30,000 paid attendees over a 3-day weekend in 2015.

Movies in the park are shown throughout the year.

== Geography ==
The park is bounded on the east by Croton Road, the north by Post Road and Eastern Florida State College, on the west by Wickham Road, and on the south by Parkway Drive. It contains two ponds.
