= The Virtual Wall =

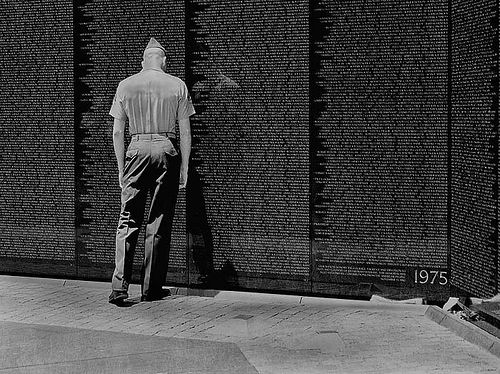
A Marine at Vietnam Memorial, Washington on 4 July 2002

The Virtual Wall is an online Vietnam War memorial. The website opened on March 23, 1997 and is run by the not-for-profit organization, www.VirtualWall.org Ltd. The Virtual Wall has a separate memorial page for each casualty remembered. Each memorial page may contain one or more photographs, remembrances, graphics of military unit patches and awards, citations of awards for valor, and a synopsis of the incident that caused the loss of life. Its database accumulates by relatives or friends of a casualty contributing remembrances, photographs and their own details to The Virtual Wall using the websites free-to-use facilities. The website includes a list of those awarded military honors, the use of photographs in a pictorial index and a search facility. It has enabled thousands of contacts between relatives and military buddies of a casualty.

The Virtual Wall is modelled on the Vietnam Veterans Memorial, in Washington, DC, USA, which has the names of over 58,000 American military men and women who died in the Vietnam War carved into solid black granite.

In the 1980s, Robert 'Bob' Bickford installed a computer BBS in Berkeley, California as an accessible electronic memorial with all names from the Vietnam Veterans Memorial.
