= The Moving Wall =

Traveling replica of the Vietnam Veterans Memorial

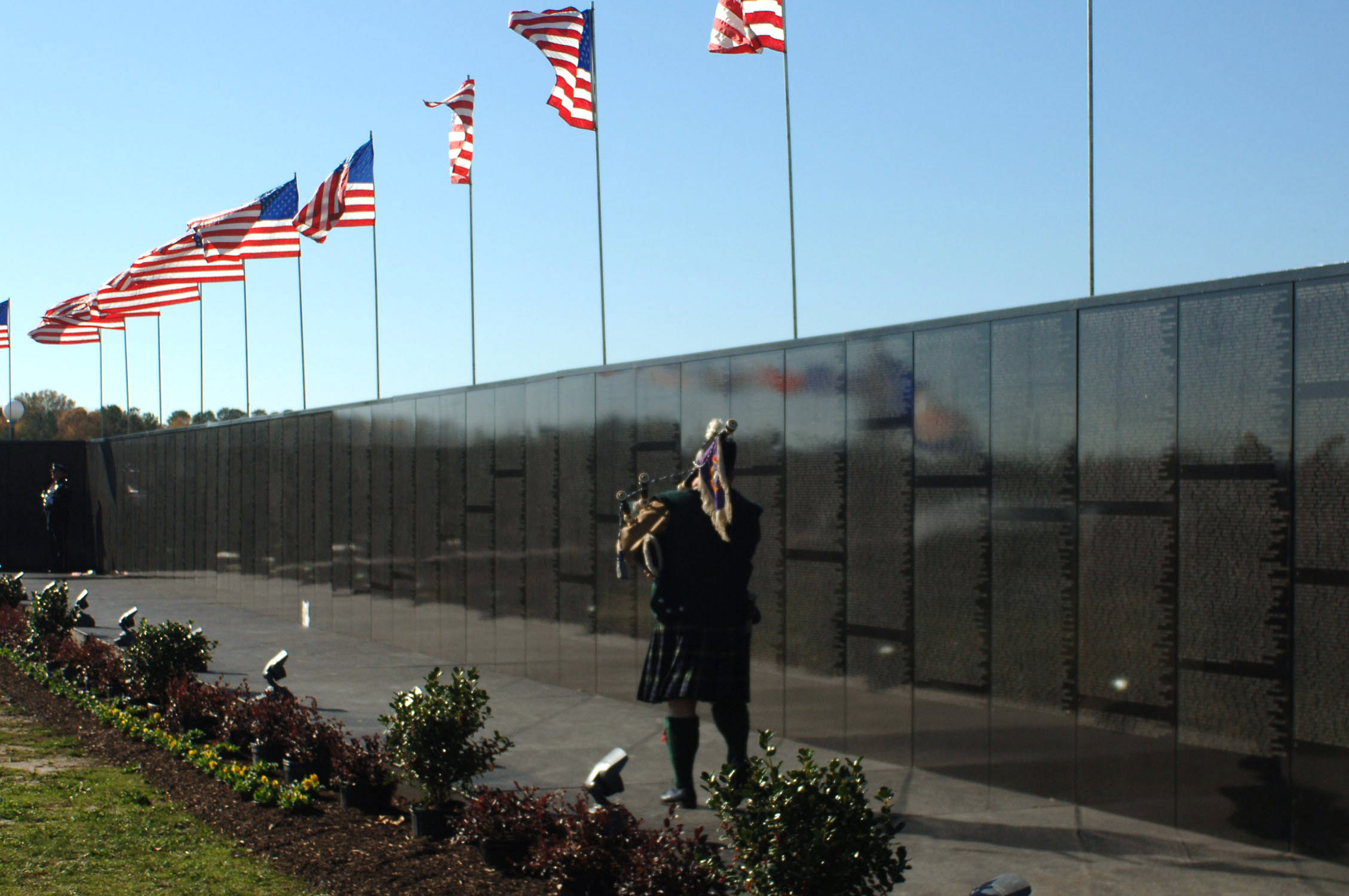
The Moving Wall at Mt. Trashmore Park in Virginia

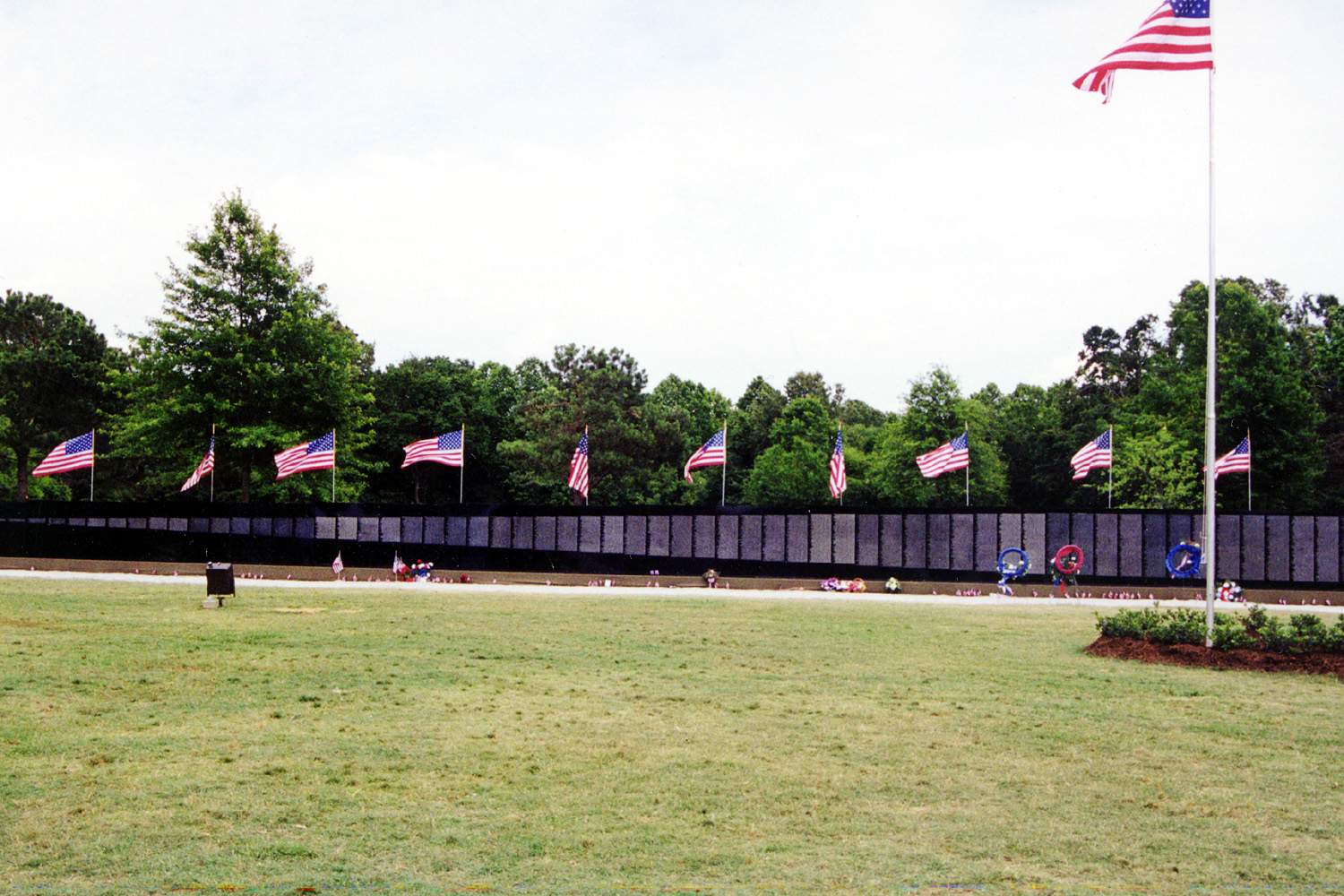
The Moving Wall at Grenada, Mississippi; May 1999

The Moving Wall is a half-size replica of the Vietnam Veterans Memorial in Washington, D.C. It was devised by John Devitt after he attended the 1982 annual commemoration ceremonies celebrated in Washington for Vietnam veterans. He felt that he needed to share his experience with those who did not have the opportunity to go to Washington. Devitt, Norris Shears, Gerry Haver, and other Vietnam veterans volunteered to build the Wall. It went on display for the first time in Tyler, Texas, in October 1984.

Two structures of The Moving Wall now travel the United States from April through November, spending five or six days at each site. Veterans' organizations contact his company, Vietnam Combat Veterans, Ltd., to arrange local visits. By 2006, the structure had made more than 1000 visits. On its visits, the Moving Wall is often escorted by state troopers or volunteer organizations such as the Patriot Guard Riders, who accompany the memorial on motorcycles.

The first Moving Wall structure to retire has been on permanent display at the Veterans Memorial Amphitheater in Pittsburg, Kansas since 2004. The Memorial is open to the public with no admission fee, 24 hours a day, year round.

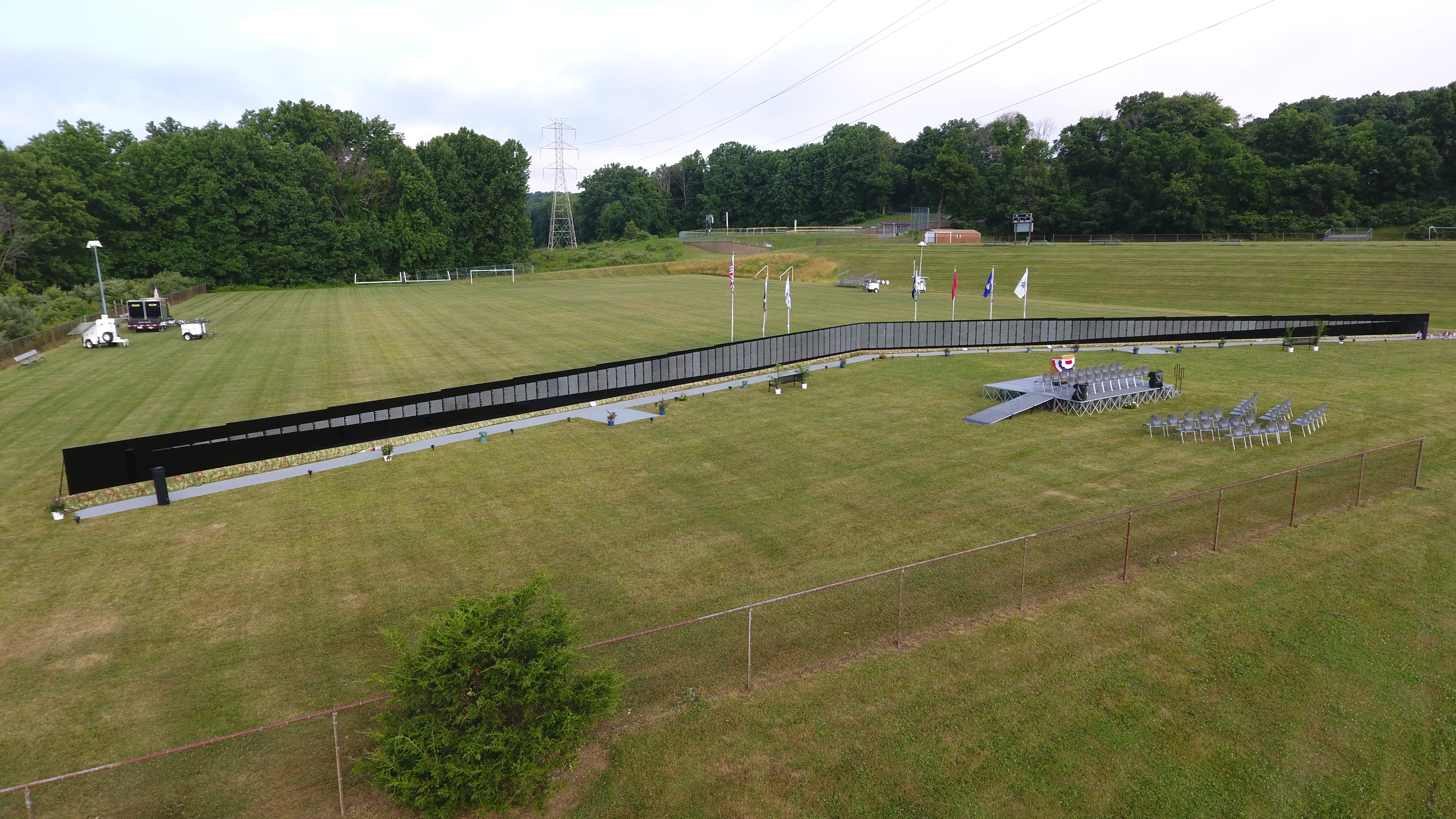
The Moving Wall at County College of Morris in Randolph, NJ, July 8, 2022. Photo taken with DJI Phantom IV drone at 8am.
