= Northwood Community Park =

- Interactive map of Northwood Community Park
- Location: 4531 Bryan, Irvine, California
- Coordinates: 33°42′41″N 117°46′03″W
- Area: 17.7 acres (72,000 m^{2})
- Website: ci.irvine.ca.us

Northwood Community Park is located in the Northwood, Irvine, California, United States. The park, built in 1980 on the site of a former citrus packing facility, is also known as "Castle Park" because it contains a children's fort structure.

The park features Winslow Field—named for resident Chuck Winslow in 1982—which hosts PONY baseball games, and Northwood Gratitude and Honor Memorial, a war memorial.

Park amenities include a playground, and areas for tennis, basketball, baseball, shuffleboard, and running.
