= The Wall That Heals =

- Produced by: John Hamilton; Mark L. Rosen
- Starring: Louis Gossett Jr.
- Narrated by: Louis Gossett Jr.
- Release date: 1997
- Countries: Canada; United States
- Language: English

The Wall That Heals is a 1997 documentary film about the Vietnam Veterans Memorial narrated by Louis Gossett Jr.
