= Northwood Gratitude and Honor Memorial =

Memorial in California

Coordinates: 33.7102°N 117.7679°W

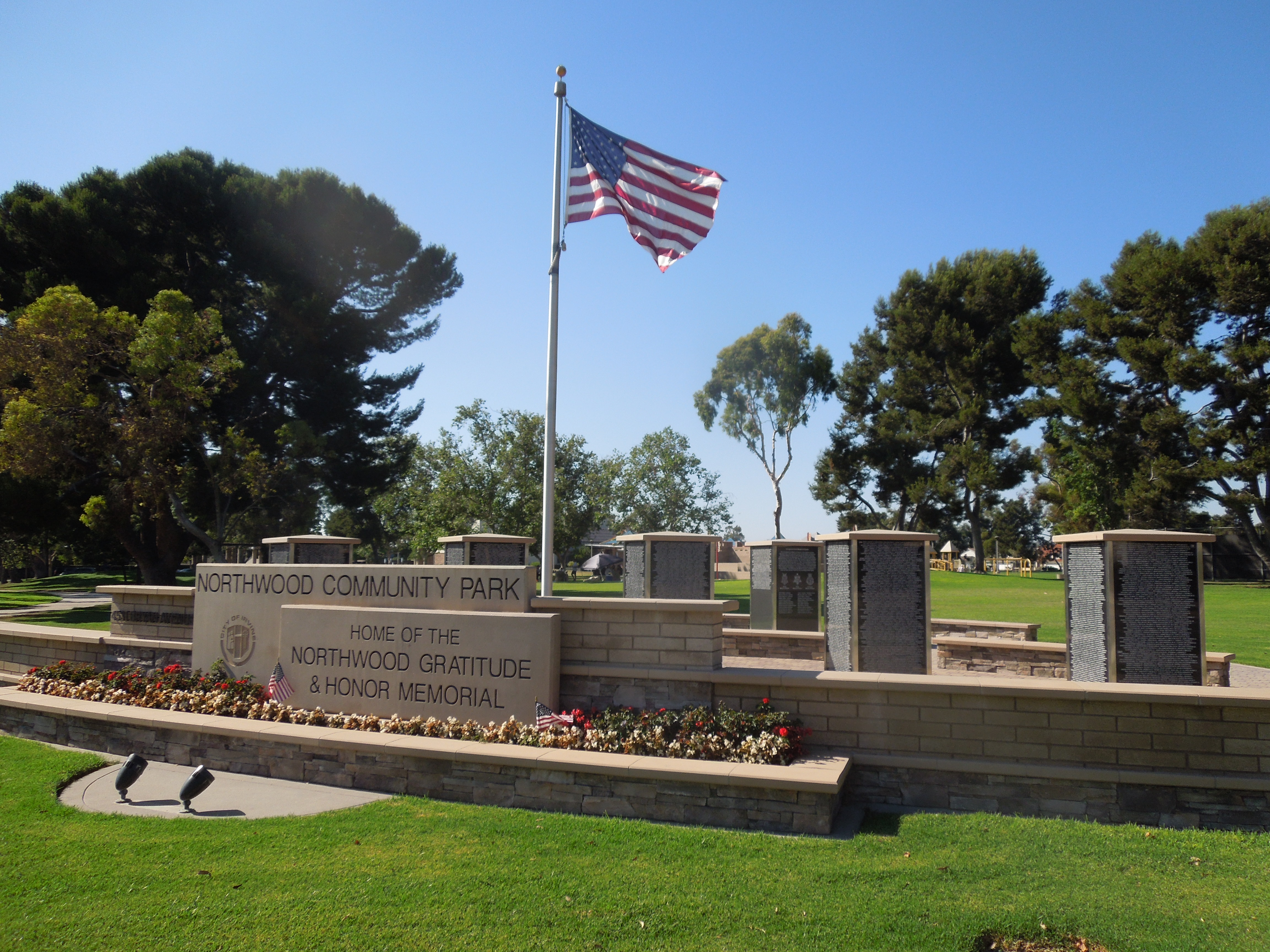

The Northwood Gratitude and Honor Memorial is a memorial in Irvine, California, to American troops who died in the wars in Iraq and Afghanistan. The names on the memorial come from US DoD casualty records for Operation Enduring Freedom, Operation Iraqi Freedom, and Operation New Dawn. Located at Northwood Community Park, on the corner of Yale and Bryan in Northwood, Irvine, California, it is the only known memorial in the United States dedicated to listing by name all American service men and women killed in the conflicts in Afghanistan and Iraq. Local community members assembled annually from 2003 through 2010 to erect a temporary memorial around the park's original sign, hold public ceremonies on Memorial Day, July 5, September 11, Veterans Day and conduct nightly candlelight vigils throughout each June and early July. A permanent memorial was built as a joint community and city project in the same location as the temporary memorial as part of the 14-acre (57,000 m^{2}) community park. It was dedicated in a ceremony on November 14, 2010.

== History ==
Shortly after the invasion of Iraq, after hearing of the deaths of about thirty soldiers, Asher Milgrom, a local resident of Irvine, created the first display in the park. The original memorial consisted of thirty wooden posts bearing the names and photos of the fallen. Since 2003, community residents have come together to maintain the temporary memorial on the same site each year from Memorial Day until shortly after Independence Day.

Also involved was Andy Zelinko, a retired resident who frequently makes suggestions to the city council. He said "I think it is the first time, maybe in the nation, what we will have is a memorial honoring those who have fallen as the conflict goes on, rather than waiting 20 or 30 years."

== Permanent memorial ==
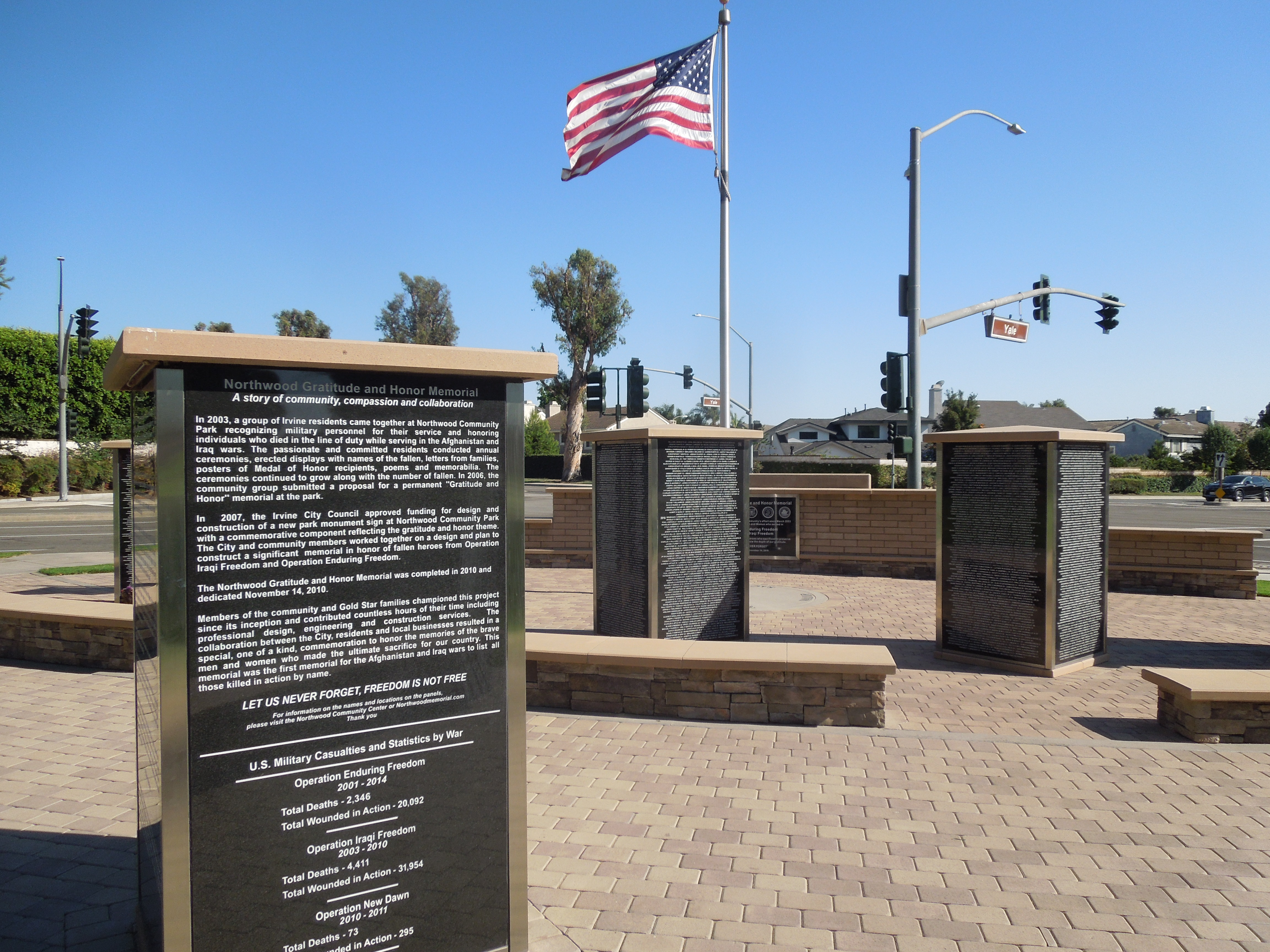

Starting in 2006, a non-partisan group of Irvine residents advocated for the establishment of a permanent memorial near the site of the temporary memorial that was set up annually. In late 2009, after debate and conflict among city leaders and local residents, the Irvine City Council unanimously approved a plan to create a permanent memorial. The city leaders approved the spending of the $150,000 already earmarked in 2006 for the $210,000 project, while community members pledged to cover the remaining shortfall through donations and support from the community. The final decision was made December 8, 2009, when the order of names (alphabetic vs. chronological) and whether the names would be segregated by theatre was discussed. The project was designated Capital Improvement Project 397080.

Expenses included:

- $60,000 labor (provided pro bono by community volunteers and contractors)
- $80,000 materials
- $30,000 management
- $40,000 city overhead and financing

== Updates to the Memorial ==
As the first and only memorial dedicated to listing by name all the American service men and women killed in the conflicts in Afghanistan and Iraq, the memorial includes plans for updating it over time as names of the dead accumulate.

At its dedication the Memorial displayed the names of 5,714 American casualties. As of May 25, 2015, the Memorial displayed 6,829 names. These are all the casualties reported by the Pentagon for the period from October 1, 2001 through December 28, 2014 (the end of Operation Enduring Freedom).

=== Description ===
The memorial includes names of all members of the American military reported by the Department of Defense to have died while associated with Operation Enduring Freedom, Operation Iraqi Freedom, or Operation New Dawn.

Three blank panels will be hung at the Memorial and additional names will be processed in the same fashion except that the sandblasting will be done with a portable device on site at the Memorial. A reserve fund is being accumulated to pay for the future engraving, and to pay for an expansion of the Memorial if circumstances warrant it. (Each panel holds 350 names.)

=== Features ===
- Monument sign and plaque
- Lighted flagpole
- Paved walkway
- Three bench seats
- Five granite covered pedestals bearing the names of the soldiers, sailors, airmen, Coast Guardmen and Marines
- Space for approximately 8,000 names, will be updated with new names periodically

== See also ==
- Tim Vakoc, Army chaplain
