= Northwood, Irvine, California =

Planning area in Irvine, California

Coordinates: 33.7126°N 117.7567°W

Northwood is a community encompassing the northern portions of the city of Irvine, in Orange County, California. It covers the area enclosed by the Santa Ana Freeway, Culver Drive, Portola Parkway and Jeffrey Road.

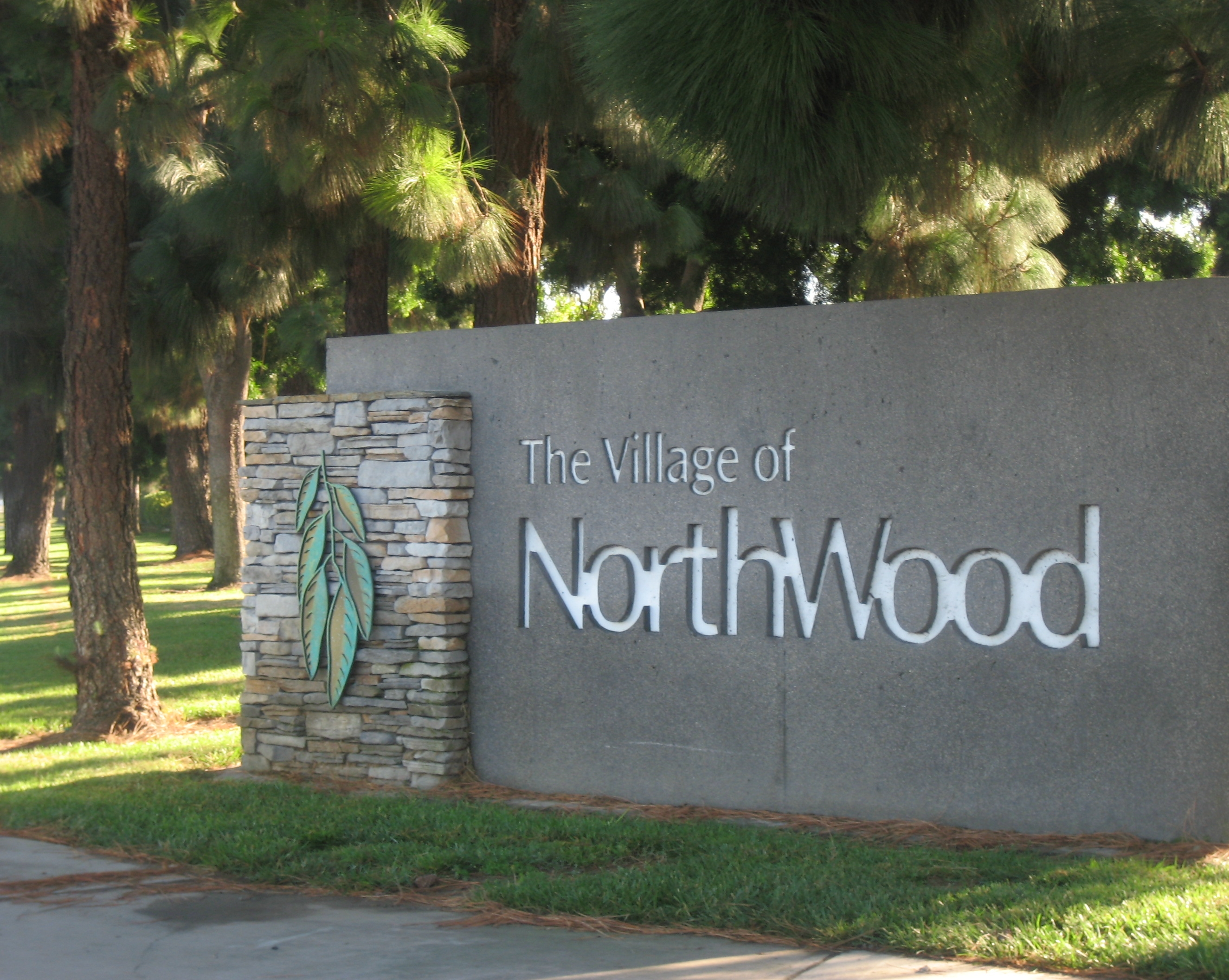
Sign announcing the area of Northwood on the corner of Culver and Bryan

== History ==
Northwood, which began construction in the early 1970s, is the only community in Irvine that was developed independently of the Irvine Company. Therefore, it's the only community that is not completely governed by any homeowners' association. Neighborhoods like Park Paseo, Park Place, and Woodside do have homeowners' associations, as well as community pools and jacuzzis. Park Place and Park Paseo share a clubhouse as well.

The area that is now Northwood started off as part of the Irvine Ranch. The Irvine family gave or sold parcels of the area as bonuses and gifts to ranch foremen and other employees. Some 23 chunks of land were held by different owners, who were organized by a single developer who named the area Northwood. More than 60 percent of the homes in Northwood were built between 1977 and 1979 - at one point there were 66 models across 18 tracts on sale simultaneously.

Another community called Northwood Pointe was developed in the late 1990s by The Irvine Company as a companion neighborhood to Northwood.

Like most of Irvine's villages, Northwood is known for certain unique characteristics, the most prominent of which are the eucalyptus windrows that enclose neighborhoods and line main thoroughfares, and include many of the trees that were planted when the land was farmed, as crop protection against fierce Santa Ana Winds. These windrows are more frequent and closer together in the Northwood area than in other parts of Irvine. Also characteristic of the village are views of the Santa Ana Mountains to the north and a preponderance of single-family dwellings often situated on somewhat larger lots. The "Northwood Loop" pre-dates the "Yale Loop" in the village of Woodbridge and serves as a two-lane neighborhood road through the older part of Northwood, with four segments Northwood, Southwood, Eastwood, and Westwood, bisected North-South and East-West by Yale and Bryan Avenues, respectively.

== Demographics ==
Census Information
Single females	17.6%
Single males	12.8%
Median age (years)	40
Average household size	2.861
Homes with kids	34.6%
Median household income	$86,510
Total households	2,016
Total owners	90.9%
Total population	5,768
Total renters	9.1%
Longtime homeowners (over 10 yrs)	62.6%
Longtime renters (over 10 yrs)	1.7%
Recent homeowners (10 yrs or less)	28.4%
Recent renters (10 yrs or less)	7.4%

Age Distribution
Age Range	Percentage
0-9	10.3%
10-19	16.6%
20-29	8.2%
30-39	10.0%
40-49	18.8%
50-59	14.3%
60-69	21.7%

== Parks ==
Following are the parks located in Northwood:

- Blue Gum Park
- Brywood Park
- Carrotwood Park
- Coralwood Park
- Meadowood Park
- Northwood Community Park
  - Northwood Gratitude and Honor Memorial
- Pepperwood Park
- Pinewood Park
- Settlers Park
- Silkwood Park
- Sycamore Park

== Education ==
Northwood is within the Irvine Unified School District. Santiago Hills Elementary School, Canyon View Elementary School, Brywood Elementary School, and Northwood Elementary School are all elementary schools within Northwood.

Sierra Vista Middle School and Northwood High School serve as the middle school and high school in Northwood.

== Shopping centers ==
The following shopping centers are located in the community:

- Northwood Town Center
- Cypress Village Shopping Center (formerly Trabuco Plaza)
- Orchard Hills Shopping Center
- Northpark Plaza Shopping Center
