= Patriot Guard Riders =

American nonprofit organization

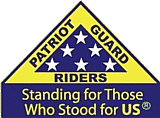
- Abbreviation: PGR
- Founded: 2005
- Founders: Chuck "Pappy" Barshney
- Founded at: Mulvane, Kansas
- Type: 501(c)(3) registered
- Region served: United States of America
- Members: 329,696 (2011)
- Key people: George H Winslow, Jr. President
- Website: www.patriotguard.org

The Patriot Guard Riders (PGR) is an organization based in the United States whose members attend the funerals of members of the U.S. military and first responders at the invitation of a decedent's family.

The group forms a voluntary honor guard at military burials, helps protect mourners from harassment and fills out the ranks at burials of indigent and homeless veterans. In addition to attending funerals, the group also greets troops returning from overseas at homecoming celebrations and performs volunteer work for veteran's organizations such as Veterans Homes.

The organization is open to any persons, regardless of political affiliation, veteran status, or whether or not they ride motorcycles, as long as they have "a deep respect for those who serve our country".

Some media reports have referred to the PGR as a motorcycle club. Patriot Guard Riders' representatives state that they are "not a motorcycle club", but an "Internet-based organization" and "communication system" by which members are informed of funeral events.

== History ==
The group was formed in 2005 to shelter and protect the deceased's family against protesters from the Westboro Baptist Church, who claim that the deaths of American troops in Iraq and Afghanistan are divine retribution for American tolerance of homosexuality. PGR members position themselves to physically shield the mourners from the presence of the Westboro protesters by blocking the protesters from view with their motorcade, or by having members hold American flags. The group also drowns out the protesters' chants by singing patriotic songs or by revving motorcycle engines.

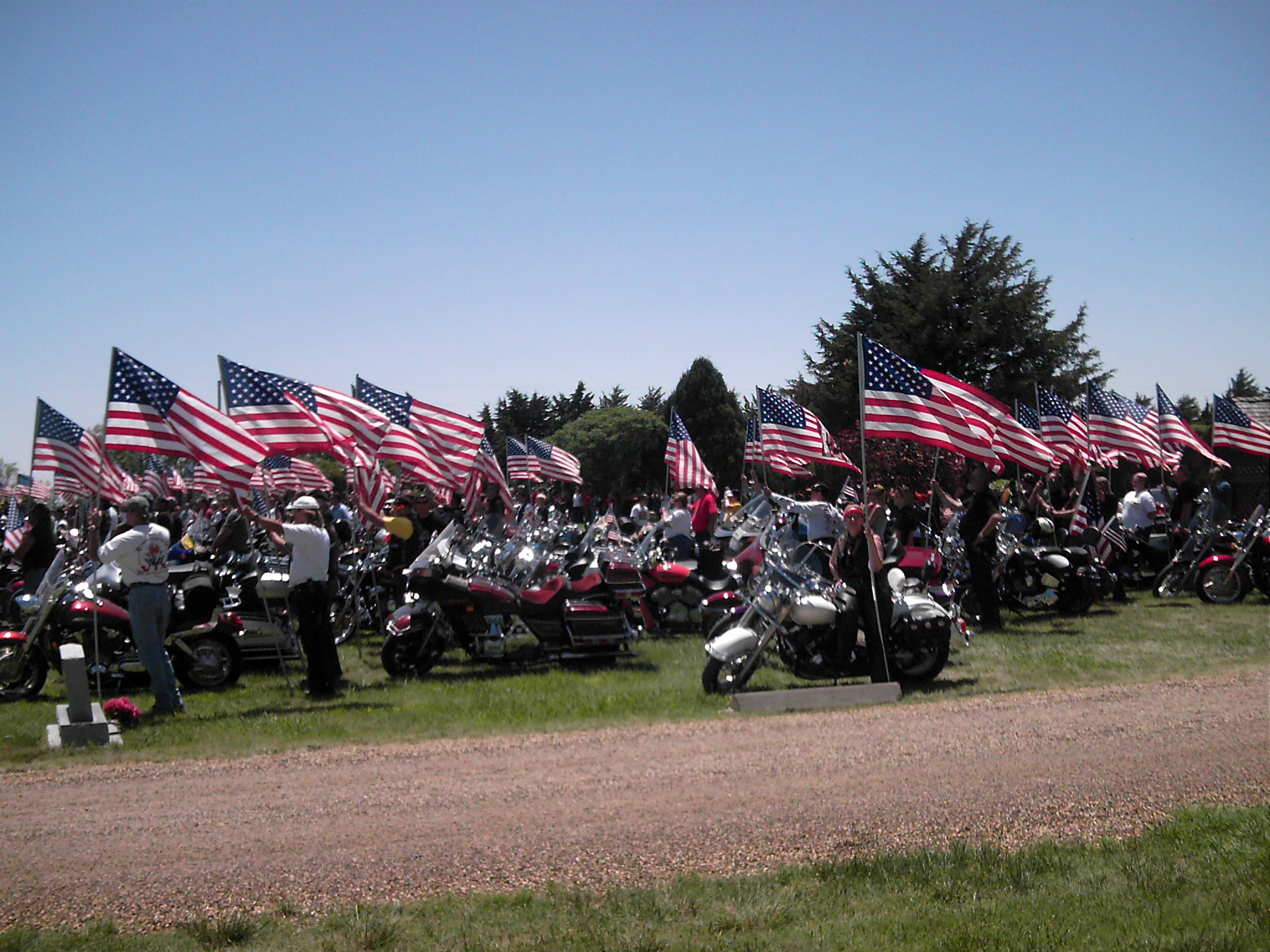
Patriot Guard Riders

Although initially founded by motorcyclists, the organization is open to anyone, regardless of political affiliation, veteran status, or whether they ride or not. The only prerequisite is "a deep respect for those who serve our country; military and first responders. The Patriot Guard was established in Mulvane, Kansas, at American Legion Post 136 in 2005. The founder members incorporated the organization as a 501(c)(3) non-profit in the State of Oklahoma on February 21, 2006.

The group's mission quickly expanded to include the funerals of law enforcement officers, fire department personnel, all first responders, and any active duty member or veteran of the U.S. Armed Forces from all previous wars and conflicts and is now largely focused on recognizing and honoring the sacrifices of dead service members as well as their families and loved ones. As of March 2011, PGR reported over 220,000 members. In addition to their attendance at funerals, the group also greets troops returning from overseas at welcome home celebrations, deployment ceremonies, and performs volunteer work for veteran's organizations such as Veterans Homes. The group also assists families in financial difficulties with travel and housing arrangements, and visits military hospitals to encourage and honor wounded service members of the United States Armed Forces.

=== Trademark lawsuit ===
In 2007, the Patriot Guard Riders attempted to register the name with United States Patent and Trademark Office. One of the organization's founding members and first President, Jeff Brown, who previously operated the PGR merchandise store, filed an objection. PGR rebuked this, stating in papers filed with the Patent and Trademark Office that Brown had been ejected as a director of PGR in November 2006, and had therefore relinquished all rights to the store and the organization's name. After resigning, Brown filed a trademark request, but this was rejected since the PGR had submitted its own request. PGR contacted all its members asking for donations to establish a defense fund for the lawsuit.

As of 16 July 2012 the Trademark Trial and Appeal Board (TTAB) rendered its decision to Brown's opposition of the PGR, Inc's registration. They stated: "The record further reflects that during Brown's tenure as Executive Director, despite his use of personal funds, he was acting in his official capacity when ordering the collateral merchandise to sell on the online store. Consumers who bought the goods prior to Brown's departure and the subsequent creation of "Twister's Store" were led to believe the goods originated from the PGR. Hence, Brown cannot prevail on his claim of priority since he cannot show by a preponderance of the evidence a prior proprietary interest in the word mark PATRIOT GUARD RIDERS for collateral merchandise. Decision: The opposition is dismissed."

=== Defending their trademark ===
After successfully registering multiple trademarks, the Patriot Guard Riders (PGR), Inc., began taking steps to enforce and defend its marks from unauthorized use.

A group in Michigan split from the PGR but continued to use multiple marks while conducting fundraising activities, most notably adopting the name "Michigan Patriot Guard" (MPG). The PGR made multiple requests of the MPG to cease and desist utilizing the name and trademarks. When the MPG failed to comply, the PGR filed a lawsuit in US District Court of Flint, Michigan.

Before the lawsuit went to trial, the PGR and MPG reached a settlement. As part of the agreement, the MPG will change its name. The organization's new name is Michigan Bikers Helping Veterans.
