= Bob Thompson Peak =

Mountain in Arizona, United States

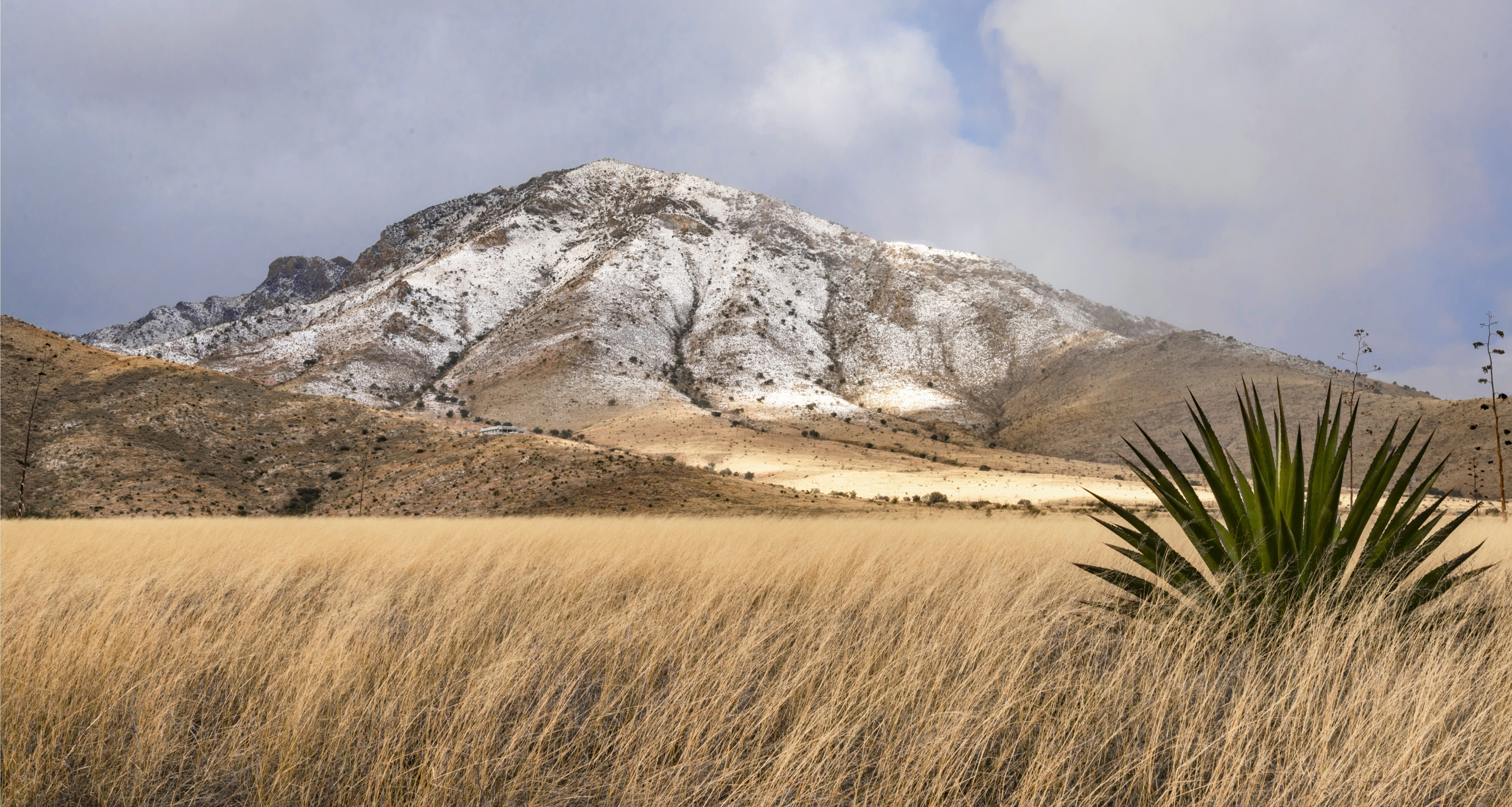
- South aspect

Highest point
- Elevation: 7,340 ft (2,237 m)
- Prominence: 668 ft (204 m)
- Parent peak: Montezuma Peak (7,682 ft)
- Isolation: 1.27 mi (2.04 km)
- Coordinates: 31°22′04″N 110°14′37″W

Geography
- Location within Arizona Location within the United States
- Country: United States
- State: Arizona
- County: Cochise
- Protected area: Coronado National Memorial
- Parent range: Huachuca Mountains
- Topo map: USGS Bob Thompson Peak

Geology
- Rock age: Jurassic
- Rock type(s): Volcanic rock, Sedimentary rock

Bob Thompson Peak is a 7,340-foot-elevation (2,237-meter) summit in Cochise County, Arizona, United States.

== Description ==
Bob Thompson Peak is located 12 miles (19 km) south of the city of Sierra Vista on the boundary that Coronado National Memorial shares with Coronado National Forest. It is the second-highest point within the memorial which is administered by the National Park Service. The peak's slopes are covered by silk tassel, sumac, pointleaf manzanita, agave, yucca, and sotol. Precipitation runoff from this peak's slopes drains east to the San Pedro River drainage basin. Topographic relief is significant as the summit rises 2,040 feet (622 meters) above Ash Canyon in one mile (1.6 km). The nearest higher neighbor is Montezuma Peak, 1.36 miles (2.19 km) to the west-southwest. The mountain's toponym was officially adopted in 1959 by the U.S. Board on Geographic Names. Robert "Bob" Thompson was a long-time Forest Service ranger who collected data in 1924 for determining the commercial value of land in the Huachuca District of Coronado National Forest.

== Geology ==
Bob Thompson Peak is composed of siliceous volcanic rock, breccia, tuff, granite, hornfels, and limestone. The mountain is located on the hanging wall of the regional, northwest-trending Cochise thrust fault. The movement of this fault transported Jurassic units of collapse-breccia from the Montezuma Caldera over younger Huachuca granite.

== Climate ==
According to the Köppen climate classification system, Bob Thompson Peak is located in a semi-arid climate zone with mild winters and hot summers. Summer starts off dry, but progressively gets wetter as the monsoon season approaches during the months of July and August. Summer nights are comfortably cool, and temperatures drop quickly after sunset. Winters are cold, but daytime highs are usually above freezing. Winter temperatures below 0 °F (−18 °C) are uncommon, though possible. This area receives less than 20 inches (510 millimeters) of annual rainfall, and snowfall is generally light during the winter.
