= Riviera Heights, California =

Unincorporated community in Lake County, California

Riviera Heights
- Unincorporated community
- Location in California Riviera Heights (the United States)
- Coordinates: 39°00′18″N 122°46′31″W
- Country: United States
- State: California
- County: Lake
- CDP: Soda Bay
- Established: 1970
- Elevation: 1,932 ft (589 m)

Riviera Heights is a planned and unincorporated community in Lake County, California, United States,lying within the Soda Bay census-designated place boundaries. It is located on the northern slope of Mount Konocti, below Buckingham Peak, on the southern shore of Clear Lake. It lies east of the Soda Bay neighborhood proper, and west of Buckingham Park.

== History ==
The subdivision was developed in 1970 by Custom Properties Inc., which had previously founded the Clear Lake Riviera and Riviera West neighborhoods farther east. The development was originally planned in 3 units, the first one of which contained over 620 lots. 701 lots were eventually sold, which following some mergers now total 631, of which "approximately 325 were developed", according to the homeowners association.

In 1992, the subdivision sold its water company to the County Service Area Number 20, a special district operating the Soda Bay Water Treatment Facility, also serving Soda Bay and Lakewood Park.

The Riviera Heights were one of the subdivions that benefited from the Mt. Konocti Interface Fuel Break Project, driven in 2017 by Cal Fire to clear heavy brush to reduce wildfire danger in the area.

In 2022, residents of Riviera Heights, Riviera West, Buckingham and Kelseyville Riviera formed the Konocti Fire Safe Council in the aftermath of the failure of Measure A, a Mello-Roos initiative that aimed at levying a special tax to increase staffing and funding for the Kelseyville Fire District, as well as identifying a site for a new fire station along the Soda Bay Road corridor (a seasonal and "unofficial" fire substation that operated along Soday Bay Road/Lake County Route 502, just below the subdivision, was never reopened after it shut down for lack of funding). The fire safe grassroot organization aims at increasing "preparedness and survivability" for the communities developed on the slopes of Mount Konocti.

== Governance ==
The Riviera Heights Homeowners Association manages the subdivision. It operates an office and the clubhouse, the pool and the marina accessible by its members. The association also administers and collects fines for violations.

The development is serviced by the Kelseyville Fire District. It is located within the boundaries of Lake County's District 5. It was previously part of District 4 until a 2021 county redistricting.

In the California State Legislature, the Riviera Heights are in the 2nd senatorial district, represented by Democrat Mike McGuire, and in the 4th Assembly district, represented by Democrat Cecilia Aguiar-Curry. Federally, the Riviera Heights are in California's 4th congressional district, represented by Democrat Mike Thompson.
