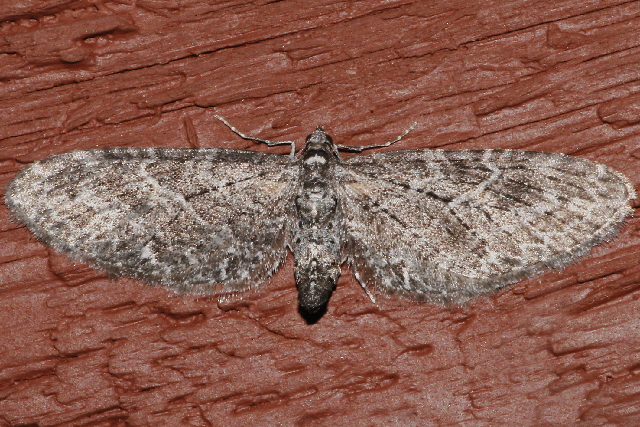

Scientific classification
- Domain: Eukaryota
- Kingdom: Animalia
- Phylum: Arthropoda
- Class: Insecta
- Order: Lepidoptera
- Family: Geometridae
- Genus: Eupithecia
- Species: E. gilvipennata

Binomial name
- Eupithecia gilvipennata Cassino & Swett, 1922

Synonyms
- Eupithecia scabrogata f. gilvipennata Cassino & Swett, 1922

= Eupithecia gilvipennata =

Species of moth

Eupithecia gilvipennata is a moth in the family Geometridae first described by Samuel E. Cassino and Louis W. Swett in 1922. It is found along the North American Pacific coast from British Columbia, through Colorado to California and Arizona.

The wingspan is about 25 mm. Adults are on wing very early in spring, from late February to early March in central California and from late April to early May farther north.

The larvae feed on the flowers and fruits of Arctostaphylos species, including A. pungens, A. manzanita, and A. viscida
