= Riviera West, California =

Unincorporated community in Lake County, California

Riviera West
- Unincorporated community
- Location in California Riviera West (the United States)
- Coordinates: 38°59′21″N 122°44′54″W
- Country: United States
- State: California
- County: Lake
- CDP: Soda Bay
- Established: 1969
- Elevation: 1,693 ft (516 m)

Riviera West is a planned and unincorporated community in Lake County, California, United States, lying within the Soda Bay census-designated place boundaries. It is located on the northern slope of Mount Konocti, east of the Riviera Heights subdivision.

== Location ==
Riviera West is one of the large subdivisions in the Rivieras Planning Area, the others being Buckingham Park, Riviera Heights and Clear Lake Riviera. It lies at an elevation of 1693 feet (516 m). Riviera West is on the west shore of Clear Lake, north of Clear Lake Riviera and south of Buckingham Park. The subdivisions are connected by Soda Bay Road.

Most of the soils underlying the subdivisions are recent pyroclastic deposits that date from the Pleistocene or Holocene.

== Development ==
The Riviera West subdivision was created in 1969. As of 2007 it contained about 250 homes, and had about 270 undeveloped lots. Water is supplied by the Riviera West Water Company, which draws the water from Clear Lake. It can store 210,000 US gallons (790,000 L; 170,000 imp gal) of water. As of October 2005 the company was not allowing any new connections, but was planning to upgrade storage capacity. In 2009 the state fined the Riviera West Mutual Water Company almost $4 million for failing to submit monitoring reports between January 2004 and July 2007. The water company treats the water to remove solids, sludge and other material, and was discharging the waste into the lake, but since then had changed to placing the waste on land.

== Sources ==
- Coel, Richard; Minton, Emily (January 9, 2007), Rivieras Area Plan (PDF), Lake County Community Development Department
- Larson, Elizabeth (January 8, 2009), "Riviera West Mutual Water hit with $3.9 million state fine", Lake County News
- "Node: Riviera West (141034907)", OpenStreetMap
- "Riviera West", Geographic Names Information System, United States Geological Survey, United States Department of the Interior
