= Mount Konocti =

Mountain in the state of California, United States

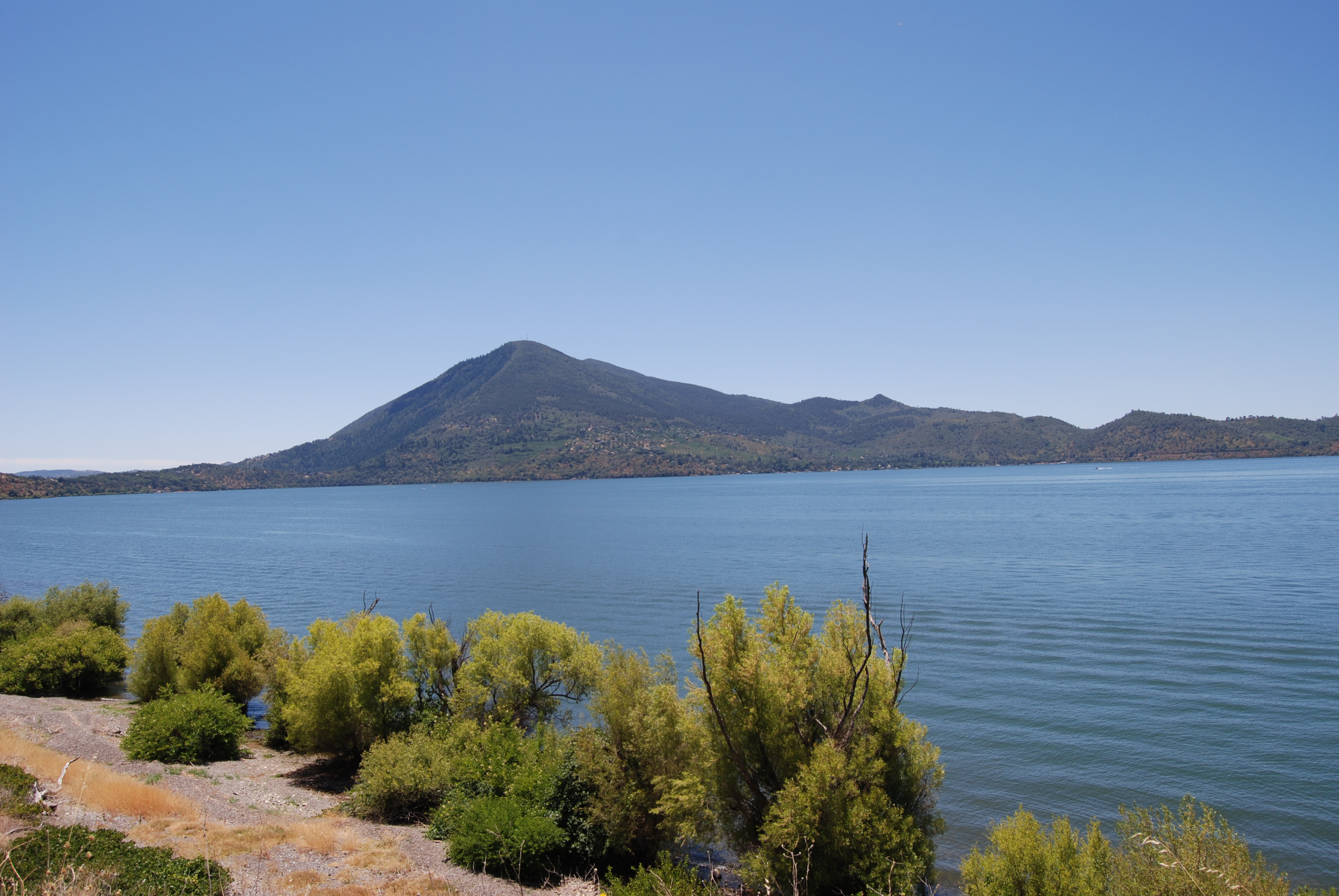
- Mount Konocti as seen from Clear Lake

Highest point
- Elevation: 4,305 ft (1,312 m) NAVD 88
- Prominence: 2,339 ft (713 m)
- Coordinates: 38°58′29″N 122°45′57″W

Geography
- Location within California Location within the United States
- Location: Lake County, California
- Parent range: California Coast Ranges
- Topo map: USGS Kelseyville

Geology
- Rock age: About 350,000 years
- Mountain type: Lava dome
- Volcanic field: Clear Lake Volcanic Field
- Last eruption: 11,000 years ago

Mount Konocti /koʊˈnɒktaɪ/ is a volcano in Lake County, California on the south shore of Clear Lake. At 4,305 feet (1,312 m), it is the second highest peak in the Clear Lake Volcanic Field, which consists of numerous volcanic domes and cones ranging from 10,000 to 2.1 million years old. Although it is often described as extinct, it is actually classified by the USGS as High Threat Potential. Clear Lake Volcanic Field's alert level is currently classified as Normal.

== Geography ==
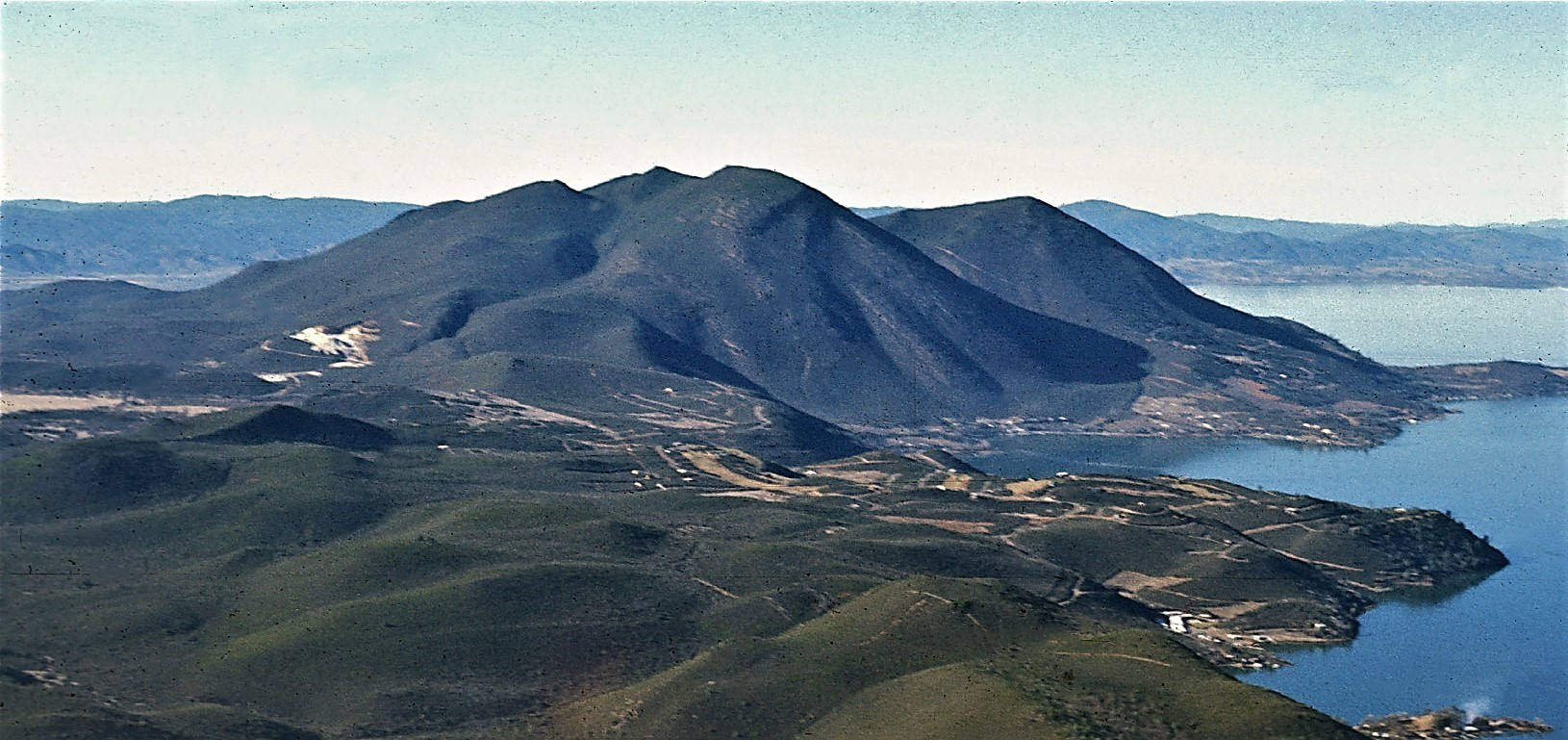
Aerial view from southeast, circa 1975

The volcano is the most visible landmark in Lake County other than the lake. The mountain is located between the towns of Lakeport and Clearlake, and lies just east of Kelseyville proper. It sits on the south shore of Clear Lake.

Mount Konocti has five distinctive peaks: Wright Peak (4,299 ft (1,310 m)), Howard Peak (4,286 ft (1,306 m)), South Peak (4,286 feet (1,306 m)), Buckingham Peak (3,967 feet (1,209 m)) and Clark Peak (2,880 ft (880 m)). Wright Peak, Howard Peak, and South Peak make up the main part of the mountain, while Buckingham Peak and Clark Peak are located off to the side. Konocti Road runs about four miles (6.4 km) east from the Taylor Planetarium & Observatory in the town of Kelseyville, snaking between Howard and South Peaks and ending at the mountain's summit, Wright Peak. Snow Mountain and Lassen Peak can be seen from Wright Peak.

Benson Ridge lies to the south of Clark Peak and west of South Peak. Buckingham Peak lies north of Howard and Wright Peaks and northeast of Clark Peak. South Peak is directly south of Howard Peak and southwest of Wright Peak. Wright Peak lies east and a little north of Howard Peak.

The mountain is covered with heavy concentrations of chaparral similar to the European maquis shrubland. Oak, Pacific madrone, manzanita, western white pine and other plant species of the California coastal mountains dominate the area. On the northeast slope of Mount Konocti is a steep, heavily forested area known locally as the "Black Forest", because it never gets direct sunshine. The Black Forest contains heavy stands of Douglas fir.

Its northern and eastern slopes are host to several subdivisions developed in the 1960s and 1970s: Riviera Heights, Riviera West, and Kelseyville Riviera. The Konocti Harbor resort and the community of Soda Bay sit directly at the base of the mountain, on the south shore of the lake.

== History ==
Mount Konocti probably first erupted some 350,000 years ago and last erupted 11,000 years ago. Mount Konocti has an explosive, eruptive history with devastating lava flows ending about 13,000 years ago that formed the mountains from Clearlake Oaks to Ukiah. Clear Lake is much older and is possibly the oldest securely dated lake in North America. Core samples taken by U.S. Geological Survey geologists in 1973 and 1980 have been dated to 480,000 years.

Archaeologists have found evidence that native people, principally Pomo and Wappo people, have inhabited the area around Konocti for as much as 11,000 years. The name "Konocti" is derived from the Pomo "kno", mountain, and "htai", woman.

In 1987, a group of investors formed the Mt. Konocti Gondola Company, in order to raise capital for a $4.5 million project to build a gondola lift that would take passengers from the Buckingham peninsula to Buckingham Peak, where a restaurant and an amphitheater could be built. The project prompted conservationist opposition, and eventually led in 2004 to the acquisition by non-profit Lake County Land Trust of the 255-acre (103 ha) Black Forest, which would eventually be transferred to the Bureau of Land Management.

The majority of Konocti had been owned by private parties, most notably the Fowler family, which had discouraged exploration and study of the mountain. In 2009, the County of Lake purchased 1,520 acres (2 sq mi) on top of the mountain, and Mt. Konocti County Park opened to the public on September 24, 2011.

== Lore and honors ==
Pomo legend has it that around the year 1818, after a long drought, the level of Clear Lake dropped so low that a previously unknown cave on the eastern flank of Konocti was exposed. A group of Pomo men entered the cave, and discovered a vast underground lake, containing "blind fish". Repeated attempts by divers to locate this cave have been unsuccessful.

Local people have long known that Konocti is riddled with natural caves. Although most of the natural caves collapsed or were filled in for safety in the early 20th century, persistent local belief holds that Konocti's central magma chamber is a vast, empty vertical cavern, partly filled with Clear Lake water and connecting with the lake via an underground seep. This cavern might be the largest on Earth, though its existence is difficult to prove due to the unstable and eroding structure of the volcano's cone. Heavy vegetation also conceals cave entrances. No accurate map or survey of the caves has been created due to the heavy underbrush and unstable hillsides.

Arctostaphylos manzanita subsp. elegans, a manzanita subspecies, is commonly called "Konocti manzanita".

A B-24 bomber attached to the 566th Bombardment Squadron during World War II was named Princess Konocti by Lakeport-born pilot William H. Wambold.

== Landmarks ==
The trail to Wright Peak in the Mt. Konocti County Park snakes by the remnants of Mary Downen's cabin, a homesteader who lived on the mountain from 1909 until her death in 1942. Starting in 1921, hikers were required to sign a ledger, which was maintained at her cabin.

A giant "K", standing for Kelseyville and formed by painted rocks on Clark Peak, on the southwestern side of the mountain, was built by boy scouts as an aviation marker.

The wreckage of a 1946 Navion A aircraft, which crashed on Wright Peak in 1970, claiming two lives, is commemorated with an interpretive panel.

A fire lookout tower was erected in 1977 atop Wright Peak. The structure is a historical landmark, and after 12 years of closure, it was staffed again with volunteers in 2016, until it was deemed unsafe in 2019.

Cellular and communication tower facilities are located on top of Buckingham Peak, Wright Peak, Howard Peak and South Peak.
