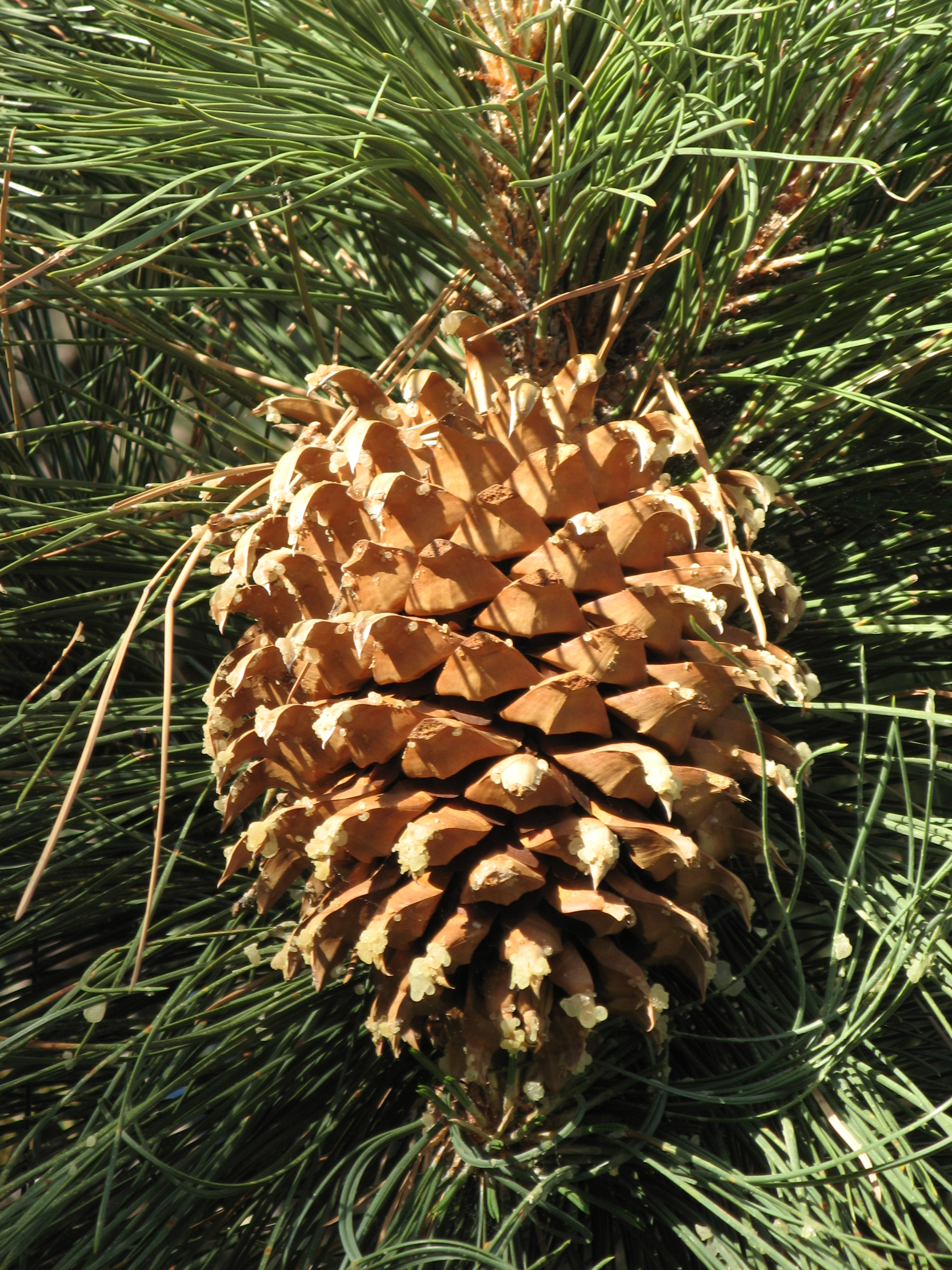
- A Pinus coulteri seed cone at Mount Wilson, California

Conservation status
- Near Threatened (IUCN 3.1)

Scientific classification
- Kingdom: Plantae
- Clade: Tracheophytes
- Clade: Gymnosperms
- Division: Pinophyta
- Class: Pinopsida
- Order: Pinales
- Family: Pinaceae
- Genus: Pinus
- Subgenus: P. subg. Pinus
- Section: P. sect. Trifoliae
- Subsection: P. subsect. Ponderosae
- Species: P. coulteri

Binomial name
- Pinus coulteri D. Don
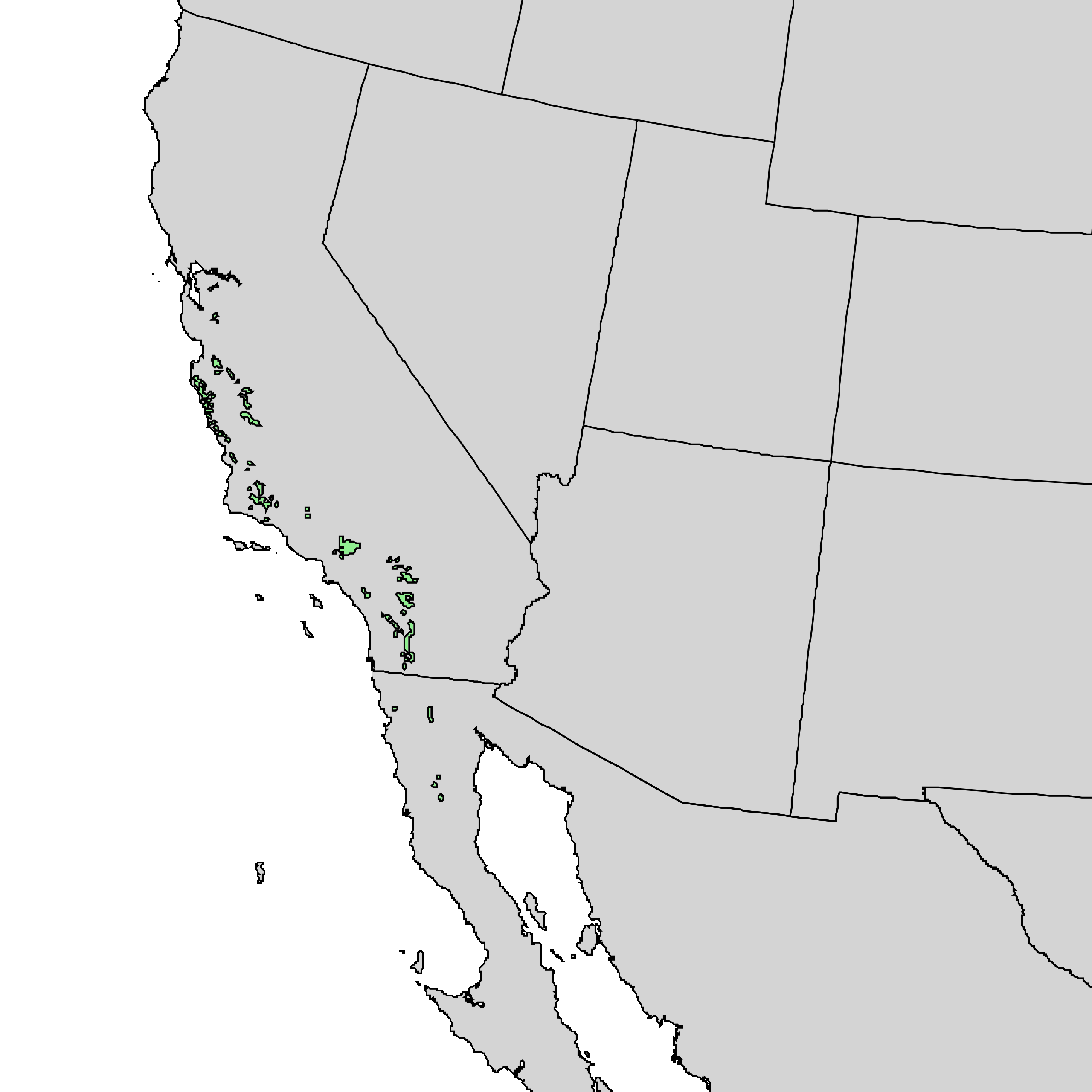
- Natural range

= Coulter pine =

Coulter pine Pinus coulteri

Species of North American pine tree

Coulter pine (Pinus coulteri), or big-cone pine, is a species of conifer in the family Pinaceae. Coulter pine is a medium-sized coniferous tree that lives up to 100 years. It is a native of the coastal mountains of Southern California in the United States and northern Baja California in Mexico, occurring in mediterranean climates, where winter rains are infrequent and summers are dry with occasional thunderstorms. Isolated groves are found as far north as Clearlake, California, on the flanks of Mt. Konocti and in Black Diamond Mines Regional Preserve. Although geographically isolated, these Coulter pine populations were very similar in all of three studies of morphological characteristics. Oleoresins (volatile portions) were also similar.

While the species has a limited range in the wild, the Coulter pine is a popular ornamental tree and is grown in many countries.

Coulter pine (Pinus coulteri) is named after Thomas Coulter, an Irish botanist and physician. The Coulter pine produces some of the heaviest cones of any pine tree, up to 3.63 kg (8 lb); among conifers, these are exceeded only by the cones of Araucaria bidwillii.

== Description ==
Pinus coulteri is a substantial coniferous tree. The size ranges from 10–24 m (30–80 ft) tall, with a trunk diameter up to 1 m (3 ft). The trunk is vertical and branches horizontal to upcurved. The bark is dark gray-brown to near black, deeply furrowed, with long, scaly, irregularly anastomosing, rounded ridges. The crown is pyramidal and may be dense or open, depending upon the site. The leaves are needle-like, in bundles of three, glaucous gray-green in color, 15–30 cm (6–10 in) long, and stout, 2 mm (0.08 in) thick.

The exemplary characteristic of this tree is the large, spiny cones, which are 20–40 cm (8–20 in) long (occasionally as much as 50 cm (20 in) length has been observed) and 23 cm (9 in) in width, and weigh 2–5 kg (4–10 lb) when fresh. Each segment, or "scale", of the cone is tipped with a talon-like hook. Although the slender cones of the sugar pine are longer, Coulter pines produce the largest cones of any pine species, and people are advised to wear hardhats when working in Coulter pine groves. The large size of the cones, combined with the claw-like scales, has earned them the nickname "widowmakers" among locals. Seed cones mature in two years, gradually shedding seeds thereafter, and are moderately persistent, massive, heavy, drooping, asymmetric at the base, narrowly ovoid before opening, ovoid-cylindric when open, 20–35 cm (8–10 in) long, pale yellow-brown in color, and resinous, with stalks to 3 cm (1.2 in). The apophyses are transverse-rhombic, strongly and sharply cross-keeled, elongate, curved, and continuous with umbos to form long, upcurved claws 2.5–3 cm (0.98–1.2 in). The seeds are obovoid in shape, dark brown in color, and the body 15–22 cm (5.9–8.7 in) long, with a wing to 25 mm (1 in).

== Taxonomy ==
The name Pinus coulteri comes from Latin for pine, and coulteri comes from its discoverer Thomas Coulter (1793–1843), an Irish botanist and physician. Pinus coulteri was discovered by Coulter on the mountains of Santa Lucia, near the Mission of San Antonio, at latitude 36°, within sight of the ocean and at an elevation between 3000 and 4000 feet above sea level. It was growing intermingled with Pinus Lambertiana.

This is a member of subsection Ponderosae, and is generally recognized as closely related (morphologically, geographically, and genetically) to Pinus sabiniana, P. torreyana, and P. jeffreyi; the three taxa form group Sabinianae Loudon 1838 (Pinus jeffreyi, though morphologically a bit different, is known to hybridize with P. coulteri, and molecular analysis clearly places it in the Sabinianae). P. coulteri, alone in the Sabinianae, also shares a chloroplast haplotype with P. arizonica of the northern Sierra Madre. It seems likely that the species arose through a hybridization event involving two members of subsection Ponderosae.

== Distribution and habitats ==
Coulter pine is most frequent on steep south-facing slopes and ridges. Soils may be poor to fertile, and are typically dry. Coulter pine is an indicator of serpentine soils, but also occurs on a variety of other substrates. Soils range from loamy to gravelly or rocky in texture. Coulter pine occurs at 150–2,100 m (500–7,000 ft) elevation.

Coulter pine is the dominant species in the following published classifications: Terrestrial natural communities of California, Vegetation types of the San Bernardino Mountains, Vegetation of the San Bernardino Mountains, A vegetation classification system applied to southern California, Mixed evergreen forest, Vascular plant communities of California, Montane and subalpine forests of the Transverse and Peninsular ranges.

== Ecology ==
The Coulter pine is closely related to the foothill pine, Pinus sabiniana. It is more distantly related to Jeffrey pine, with which it shares habitats, and the ponderosa pine. Coulter pines tend to grow in drier environments than ponderosa and Jeffery pines.

This erect, medium-sized pine prefers south-facing slopes from 200–2,300 m (700–8,000 ft) elevation, and tolerates dry rocky soil. Pinus coulteri most often appears in mixed forests. The Coulter pine occurs in a number of forest plant associations; for example, at higher elevations forestation of the San Jacinto Mountains Coulter Pine is co-dominant with the California black oak. Woodpeckers often forage on the species, and peel the bark to access insects underneath.

== Uses ==
Wildlife, especially squirrels, gather the large seeds. The seeds were also once eaten by Native Americans.

The wood is weak and soft, so that the species is little used other than for firewood.

Pinus coulteri is cultivated as an ornamental tree, planted in parks and large gardens, and used in drought-tolerant landscaping. The Coulter pine has gained the Royal Horticultural Society's Award of Garden Merit.

== Gallery ==
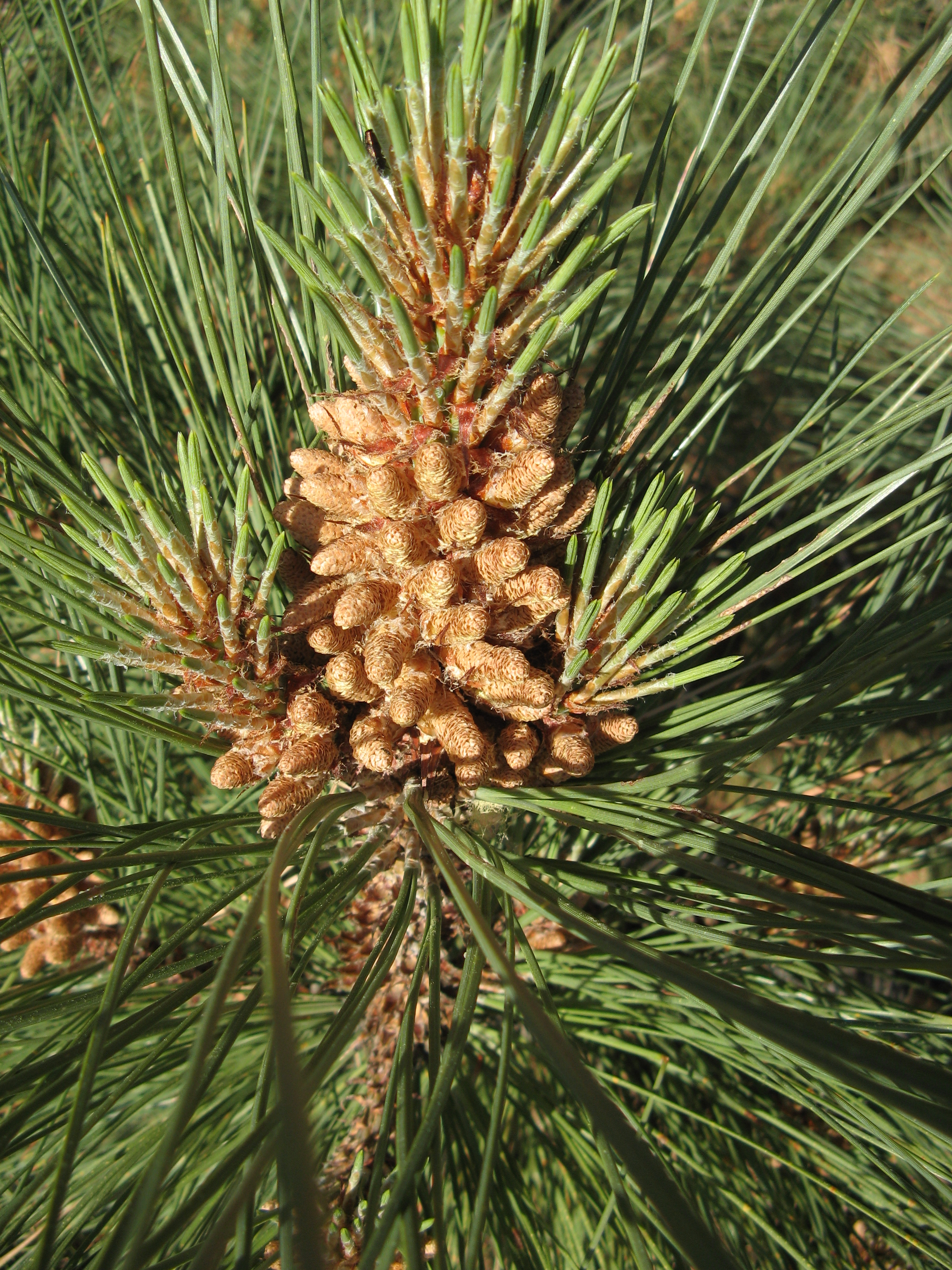
Pollen cones (male cones)

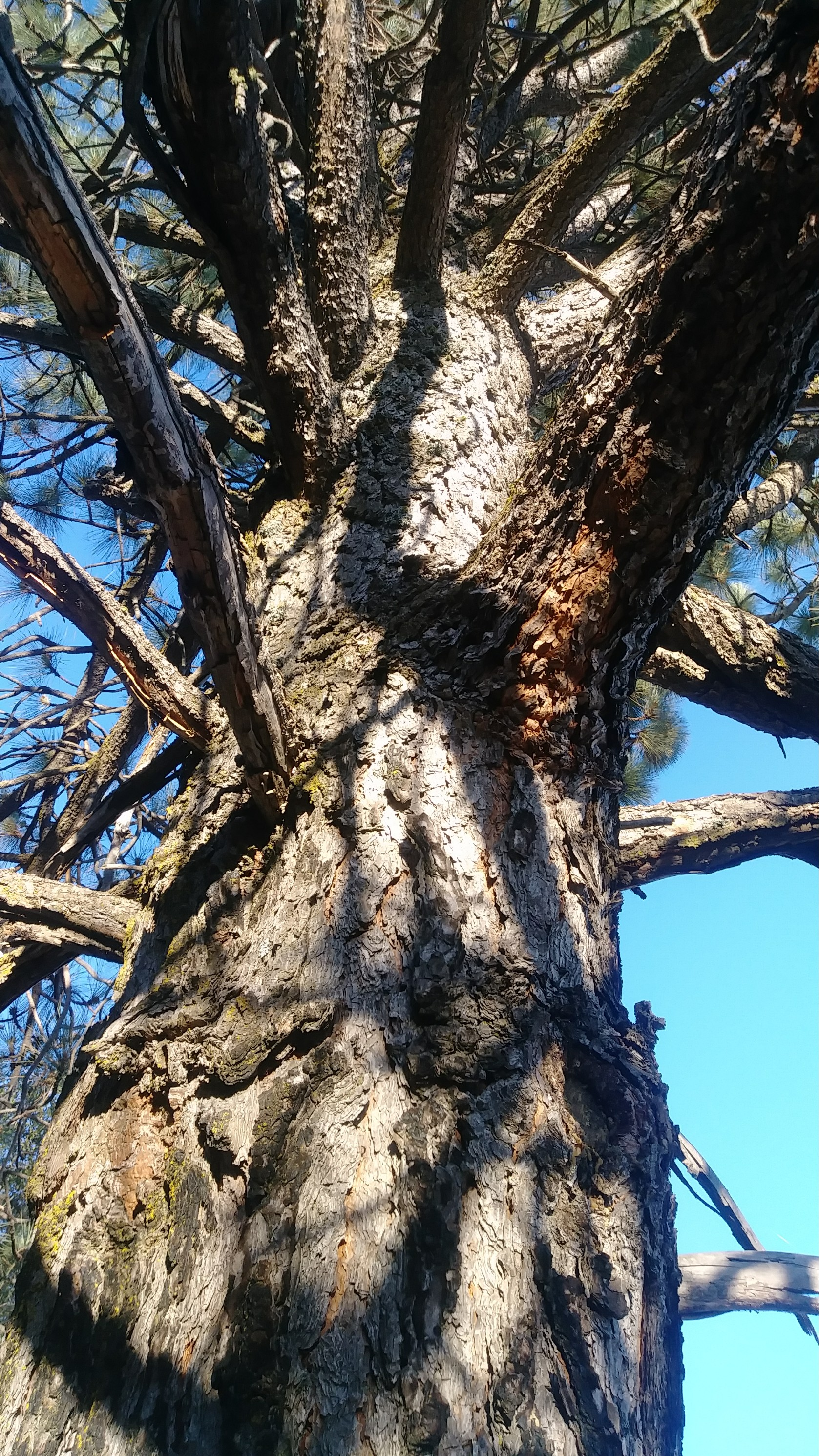
Mature tree, as seen from under branches at ground level

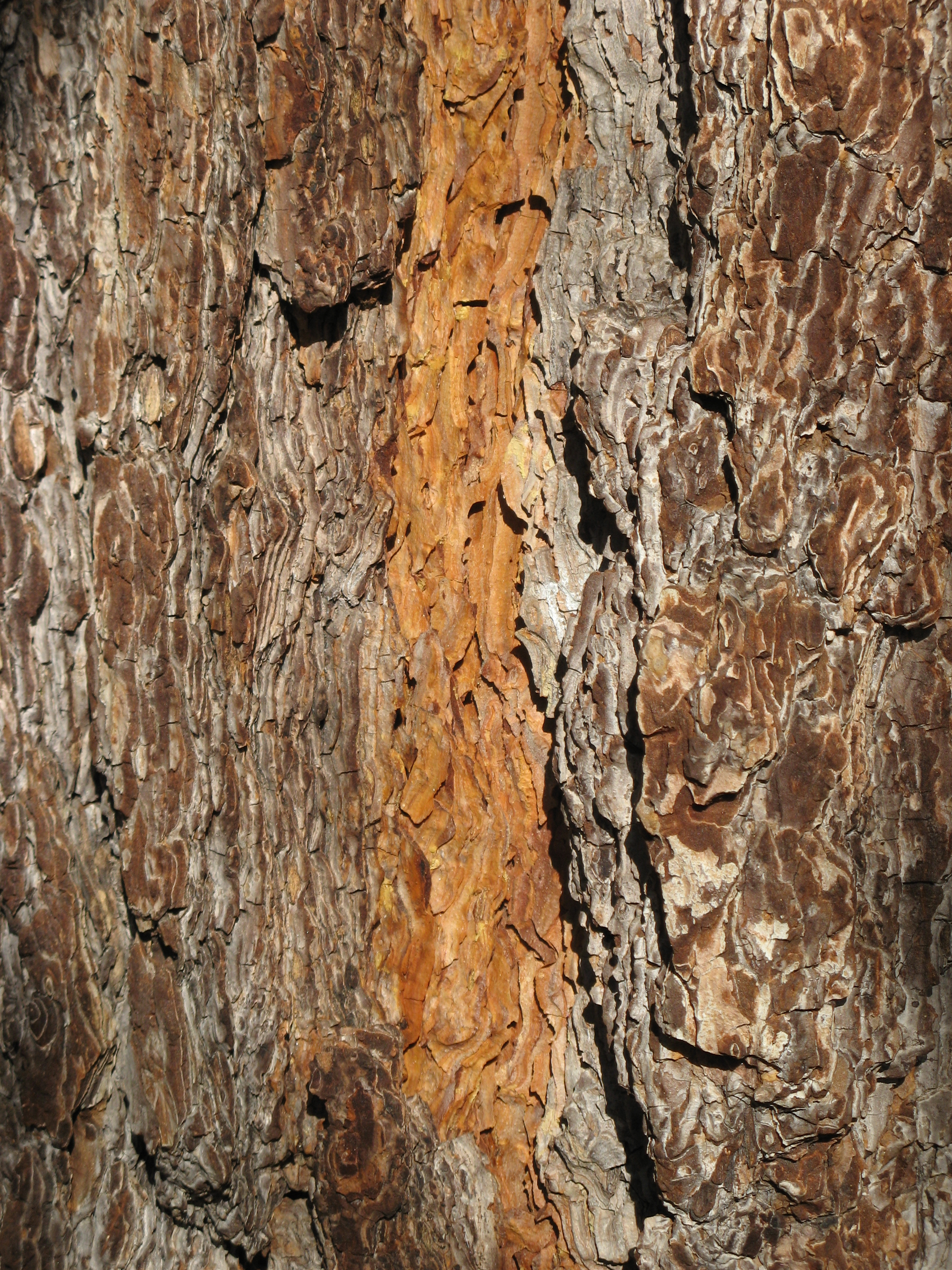
Close-up of bark detail

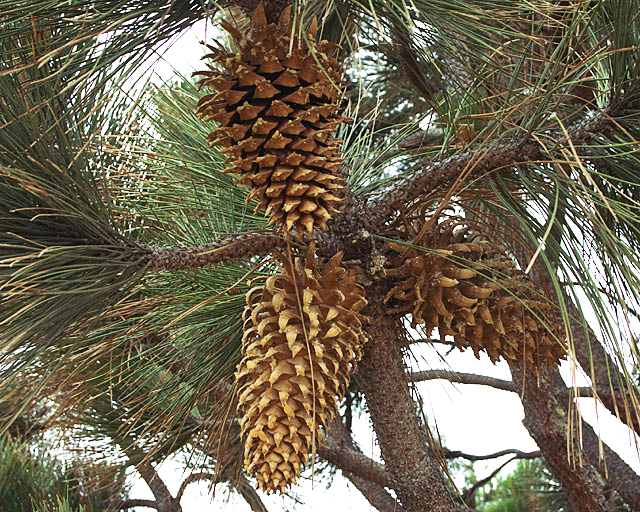
Foliage and cones

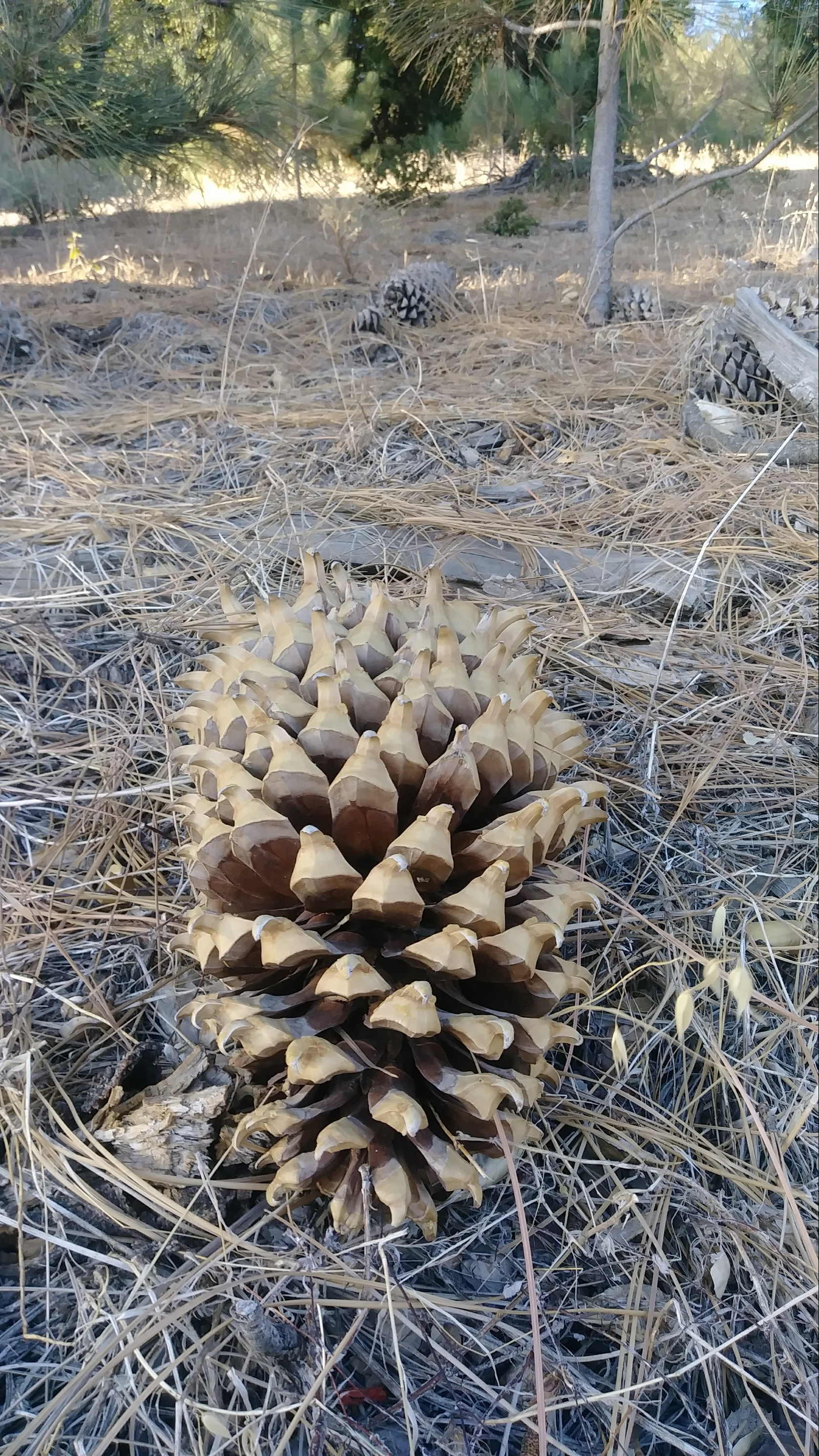
Cones on ground in their natural setting

Large cone, found at 4,150 ft elevation in the Santa Lucia Ranger District of the Los Padres National Forest, California Coastal Range of the Central Coast.

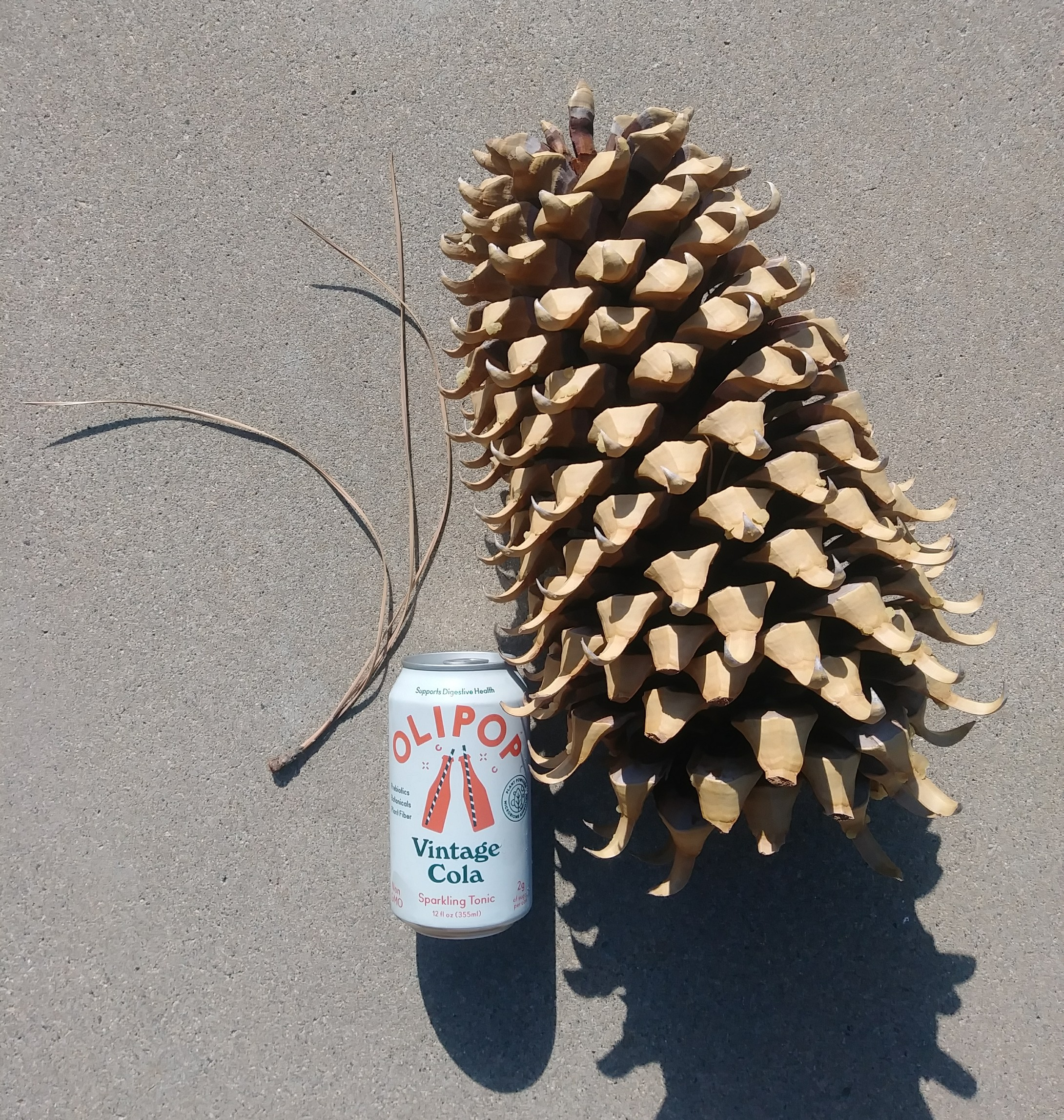
Exceptional cone example, shown with needle cluster (soda can for scale).

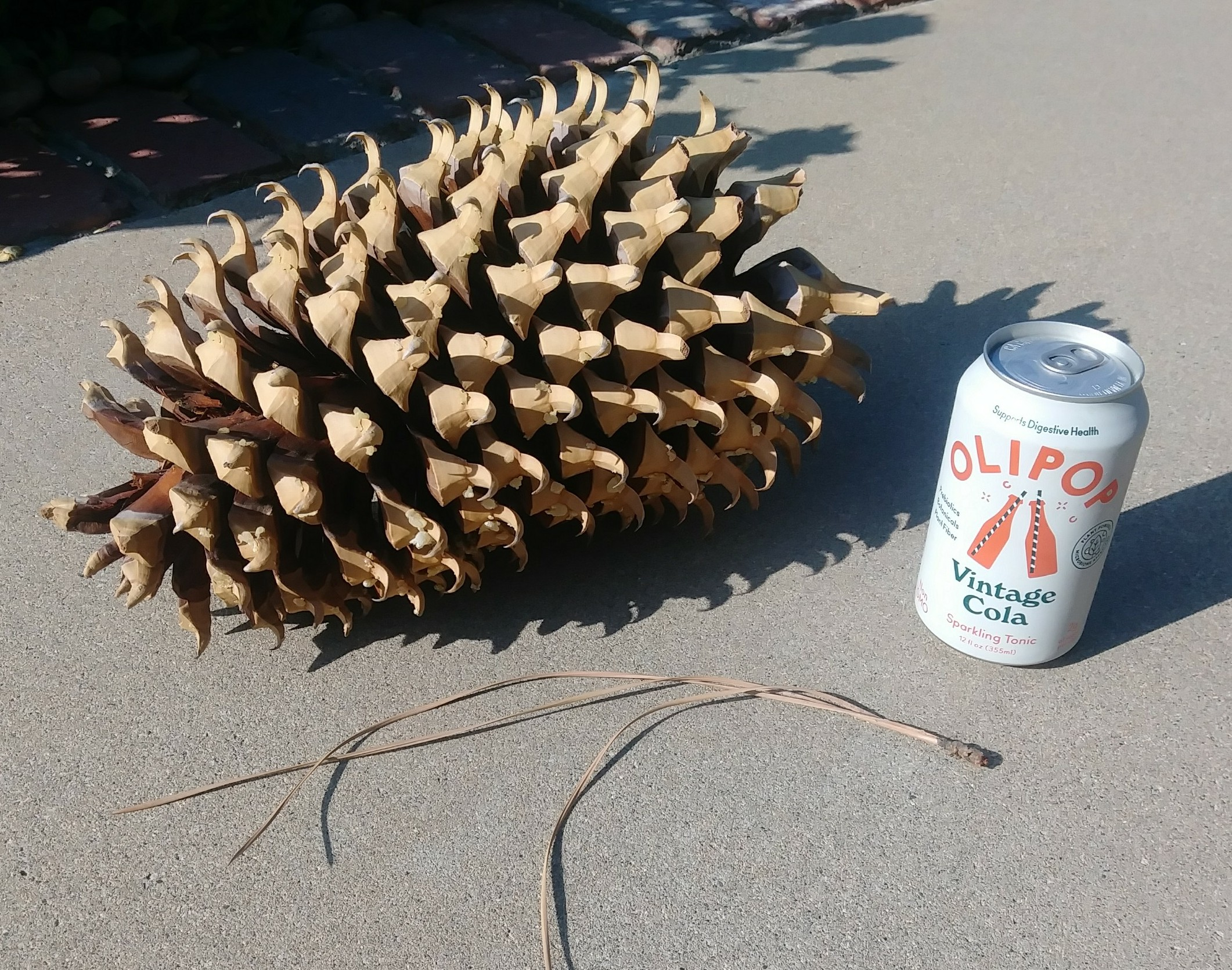

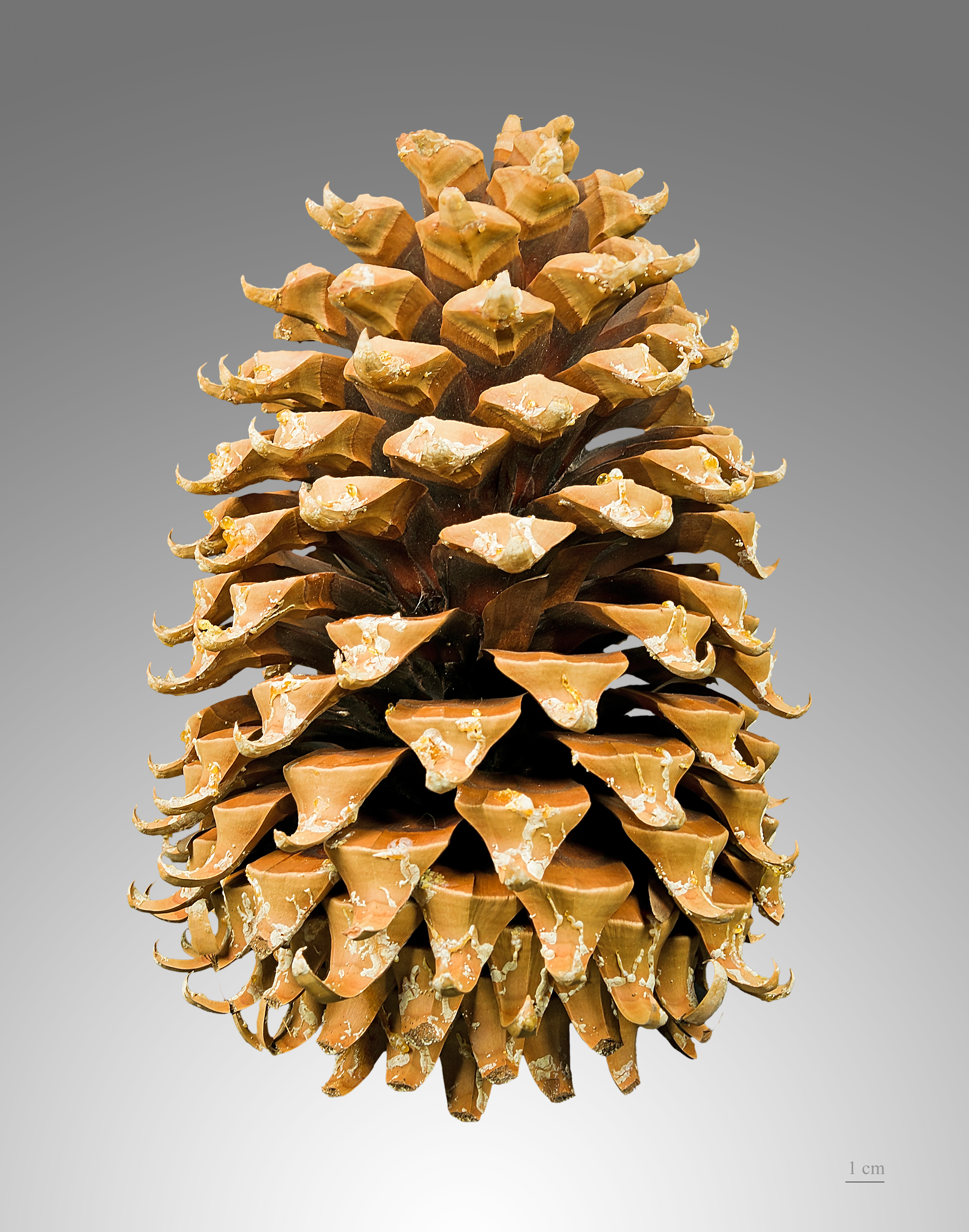
Cone

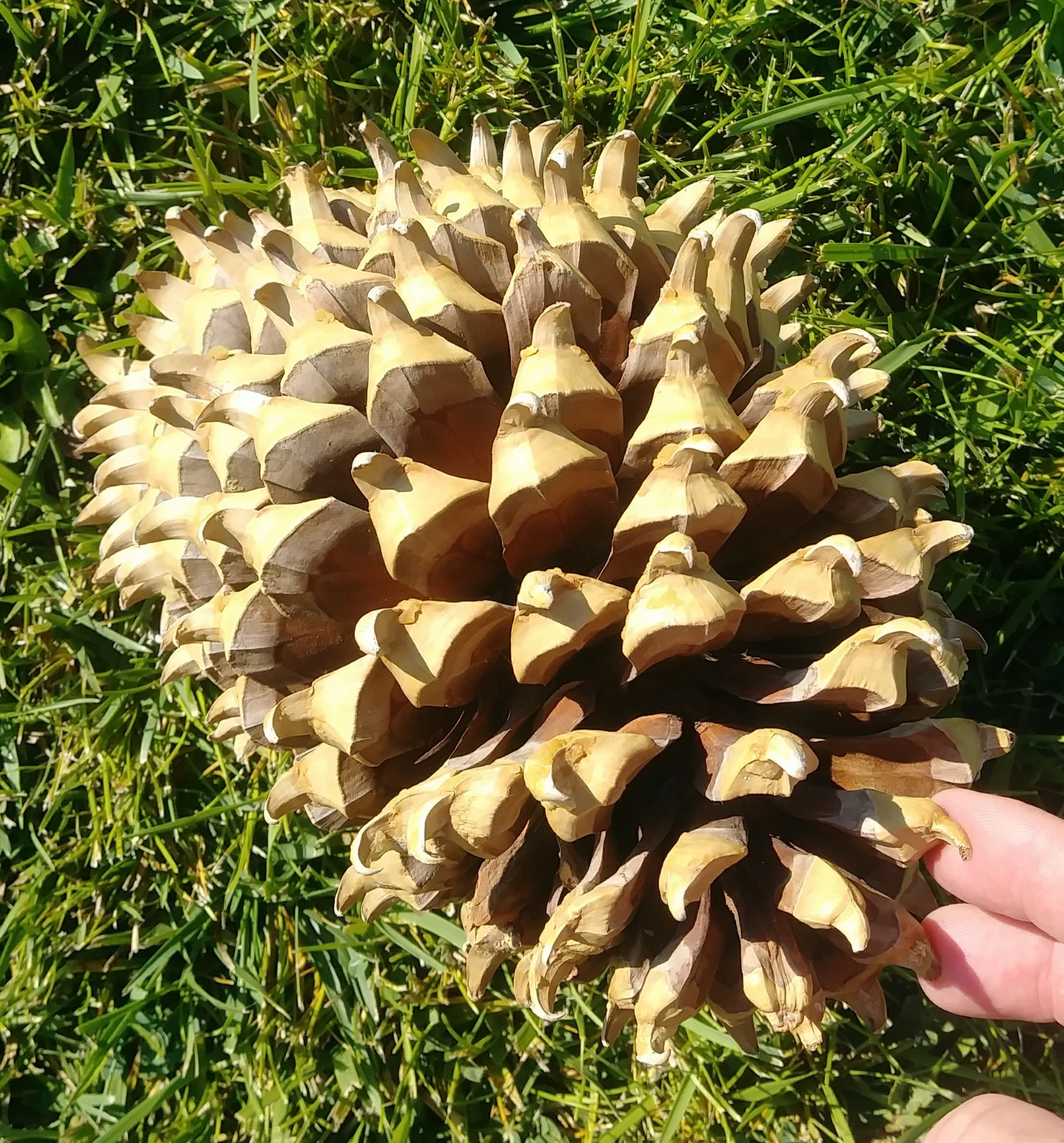
Close-up of spiral detail

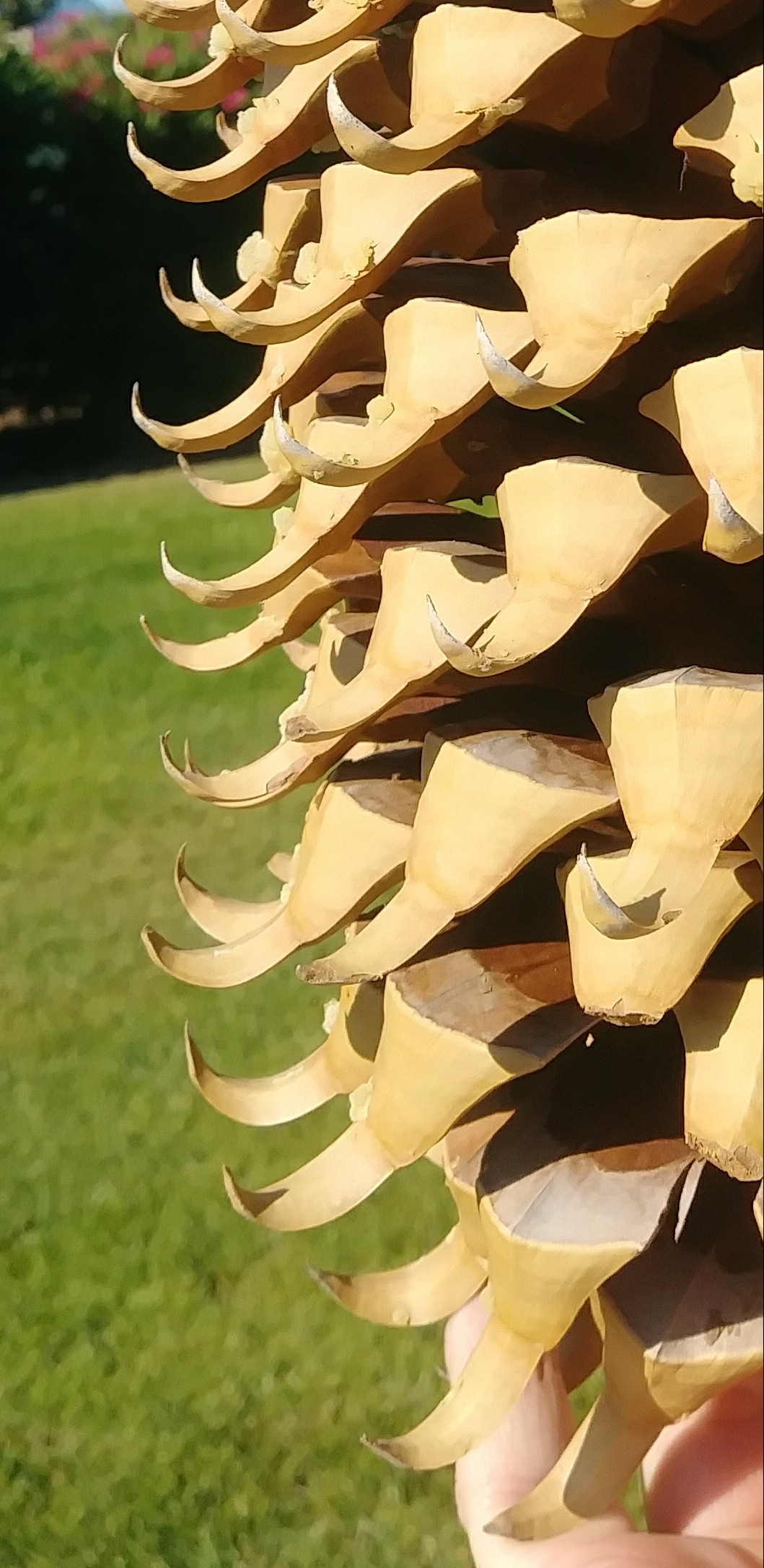
Close-up of barb detail

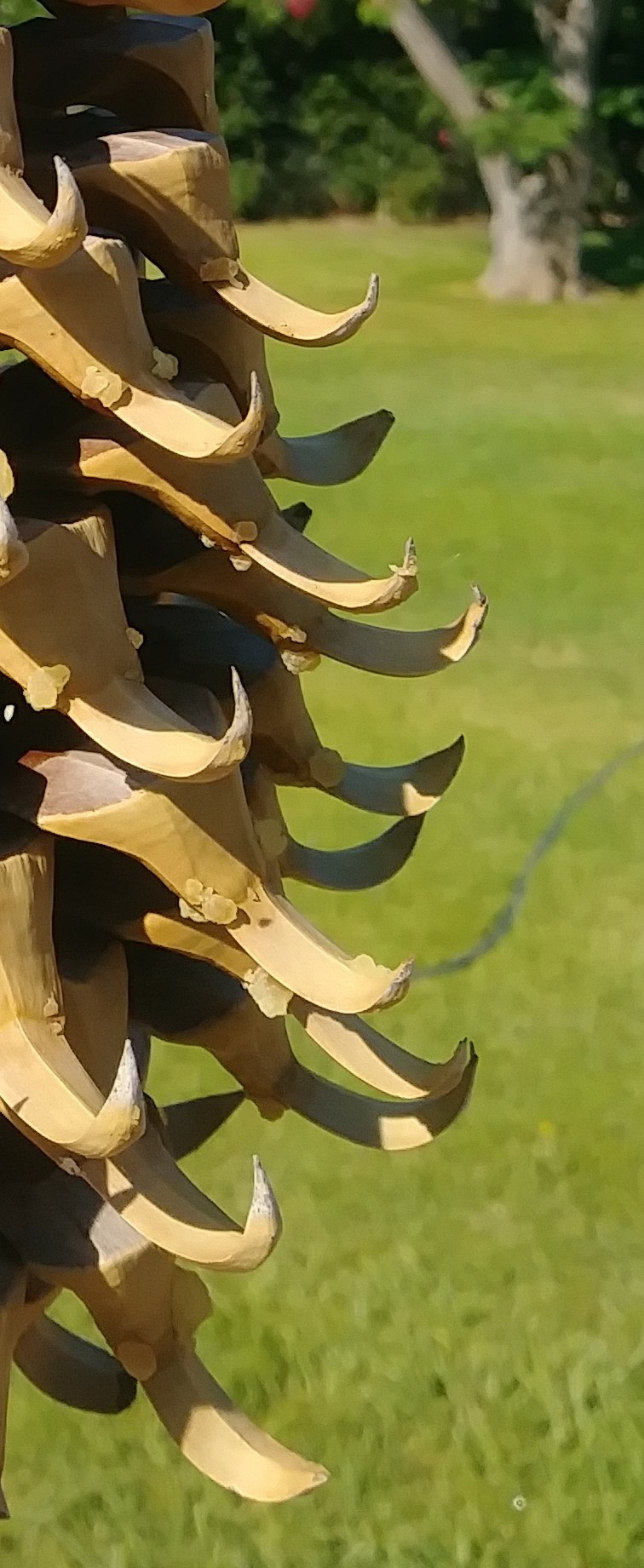

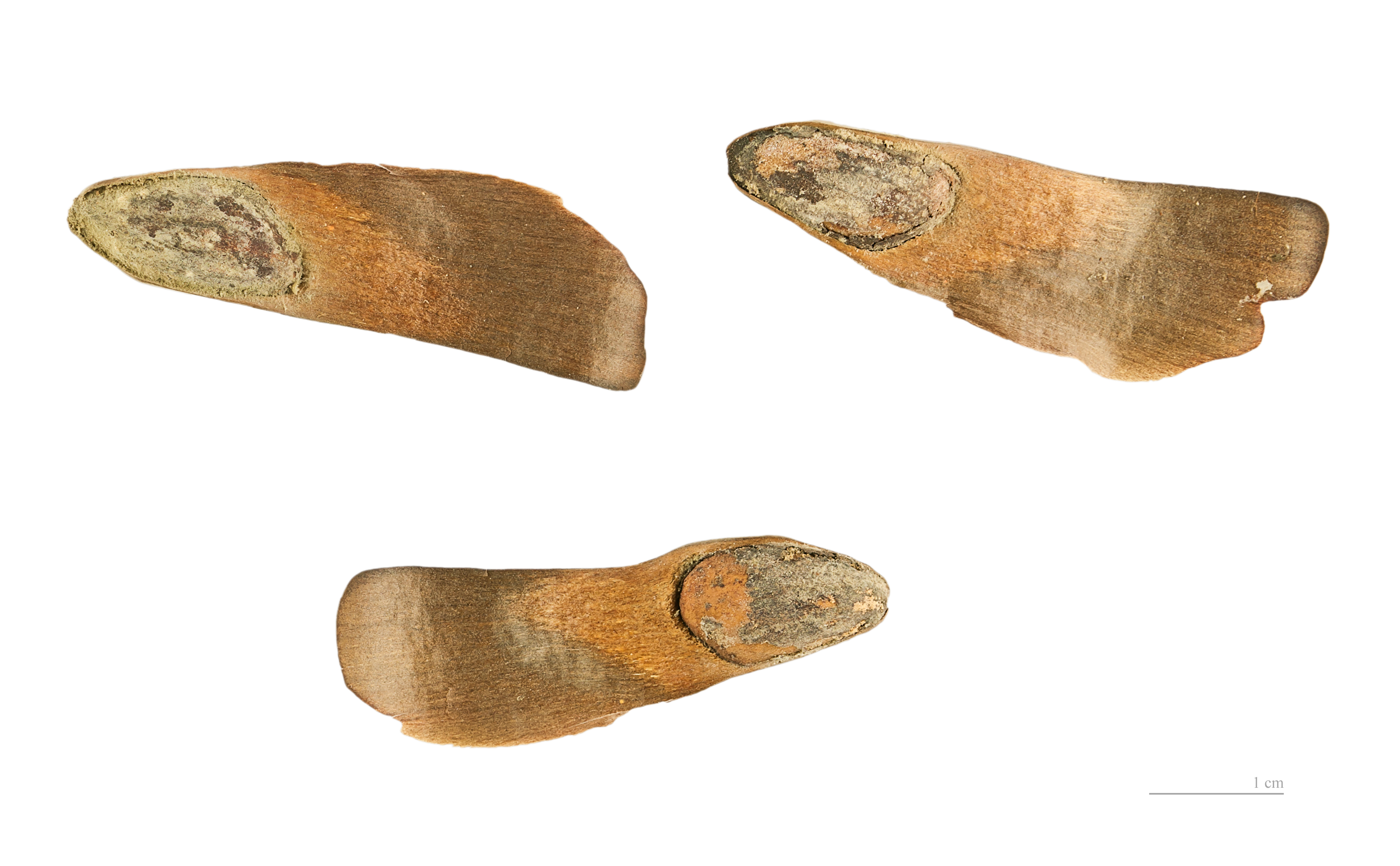
Seeds

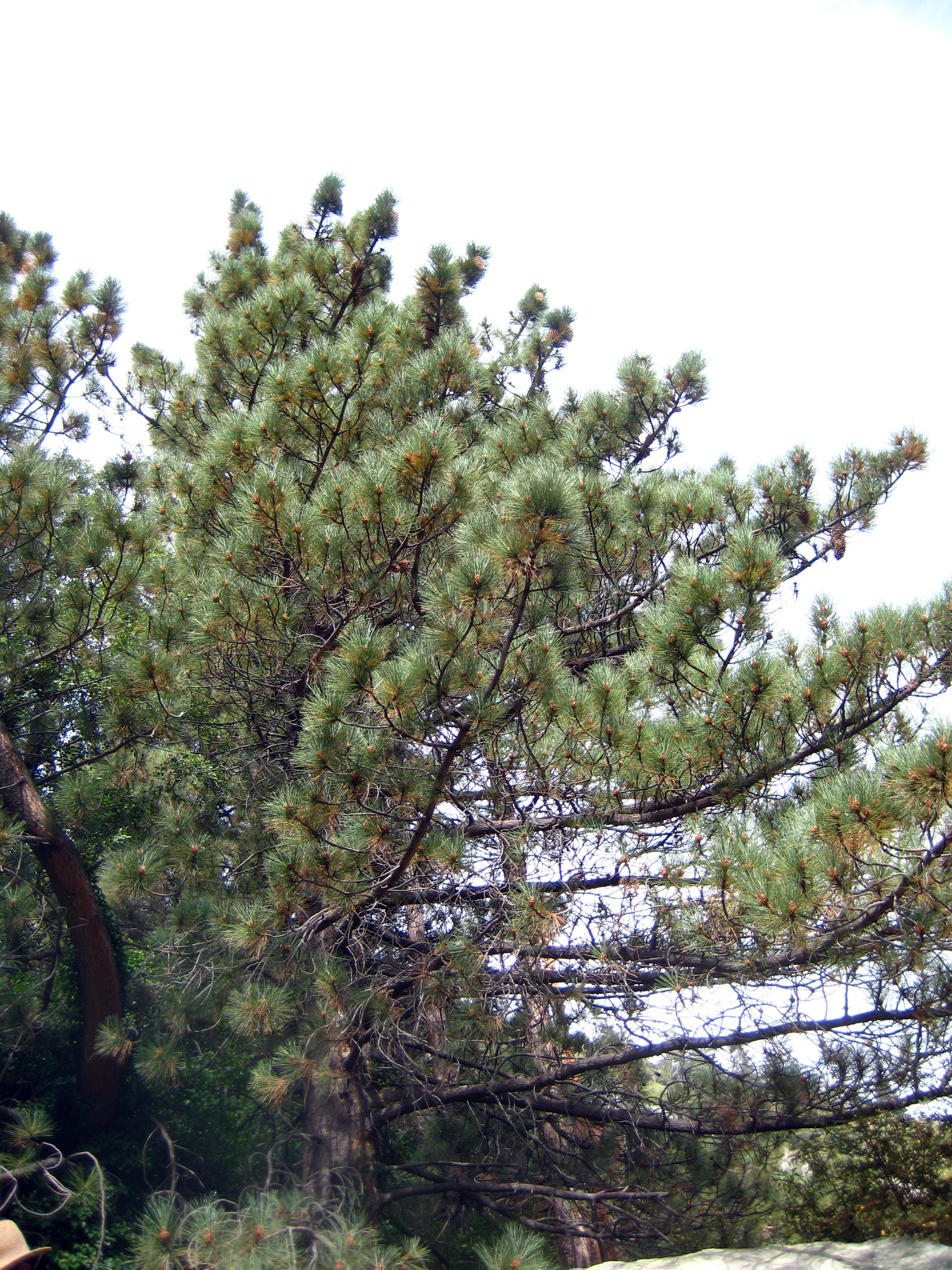
A view of the upper portion of a mature Coulter Pine.

== Bibliography ==
- Chase, J. Smeaton (1911). "Pinus Coulteri (Coulter-pine, Big-cone-pine, Pitch-pine, Bull-pine)". Cone-bearing Trees of the California Mountains. Eytel, Carl (illustrations). Chicago: A.C. McClurg & Co. pp. 24–26. LCCN 11004975. OCLC 3477527.
- Cope, Amy B. (1993). "Pinus coulteri". Fire Effects Information System (FEIS). US Department of Agriculture (USDA), Forest Service (USFS), Rocky Mountain Research Station, Fire Sciences Laboratory.
- Earle, Christopher J., ed. (2018). "Pinus coulteri". The Gymnosperm Database.
- Farjon, A. (2013). "Pinus coulteri". IUCN Red List of Threatened Species. 2013 e.T42352A2974687. doi:10.2305/IUCN.UK.2013-1.RLTS.T42352A2974687.en.
- Kral, Robert (1993). "Pinus coulteri". In Flora of North America Editorial Committee (ed.). Flora of North America North of Mexico (FNA). Vol. 2. New York and Oxford: Oxford University Press – via eFloras.org, Missouri Botanical Garden, St. Louis, Missouri and Harvard University Herbaria, Cambridge, Massachusetts.
- Hogan, C. Michael (2008). Stromberg, Nicklas (ed.). "Pinus coulteri". Globaltwitcher.com. Archived from the original on 2012-02-18.
- Moore, Gerry; Kershner, Bruce; Tufts, Craig; Mathews, Daniel; Nelson, Gil; Spellenberg, Richard; Thieret, John W.; Purinton, Terry; Block, Andrew (2008). National Wildlife Federation Field Guide to Trees of North America. New York: Sterling. p. 86. ISBN 978-1-4027-3875-3.
- "Pinus coulteri". RHS Gardening. Royal Horticultural Society.
