= Montezuma Peak =

Mountain in Arizona, United States

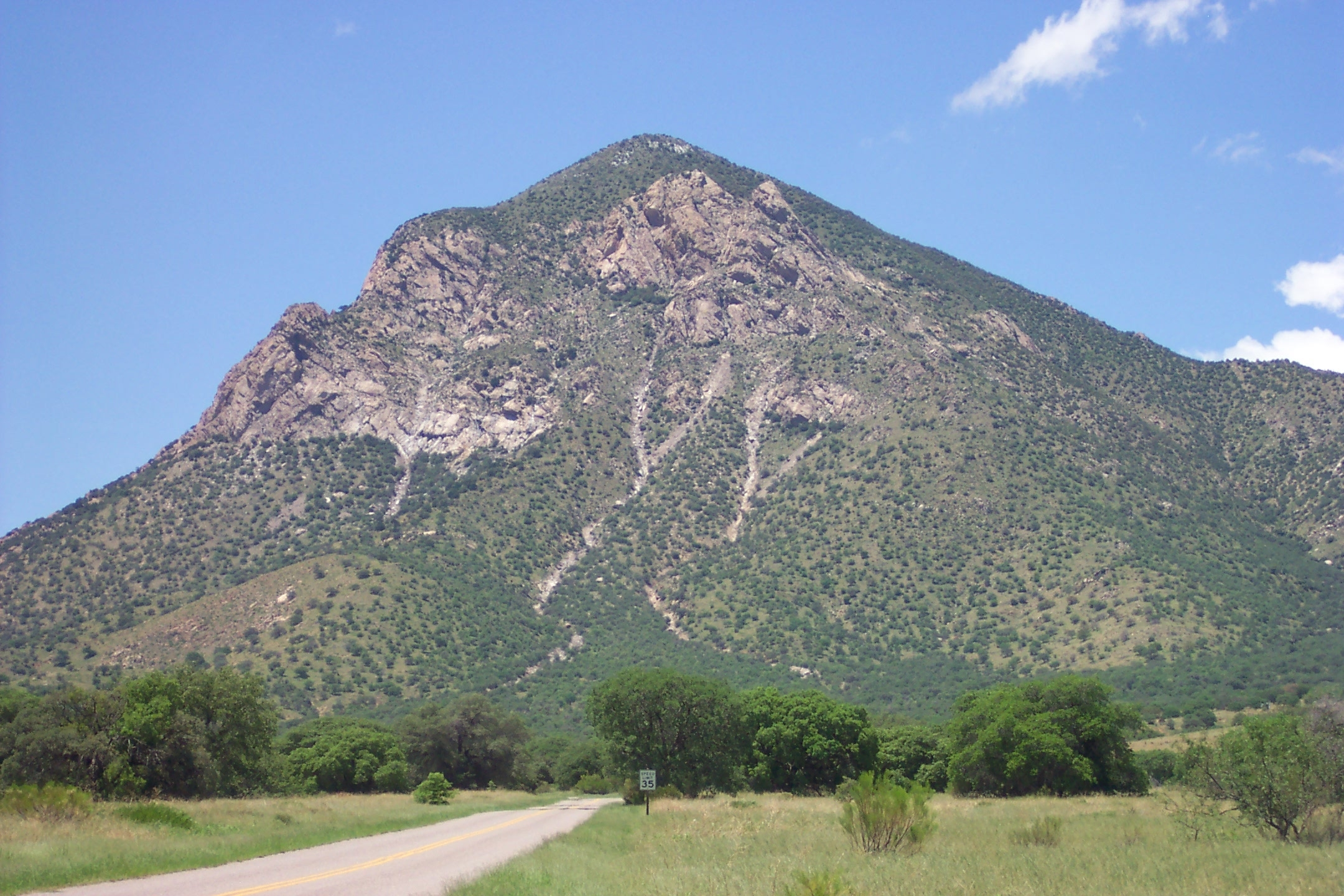
- East aspect

Highest point
- Elevation: 7,682 ft (2,341 m)
- Prominence: 289 ft (88 m)
- Parent peak: Miller Peak (9,470 ft)
- Isolation: 2.89 mi (4.65 km)
- Coordinates: 31°21′31″N 110°15′50″W

Geography
- Location within Arizona Location within the United States
- Country: United States
- State: Arizona
- County: Cochise
- Protected area: Coronado National Memorial
- Parent range: Huachuca Mountains
- Topo map: USGS Montezuma Pass

Geology
- Rock age: Jurassic
- Rock type(s): Volcanic rock, granite

Montezuma Peak is a 7,682-foot-elevation (2,341-meter) summit in Cochise County, Arizona, United States.

== Description ==
Montezuma Peak is located 12 miles (19 km) south of the city of Sierra Vista in Coronado National Memorial. It is the highest point within the memorial which is administered by the National Park Service, and the 10th-highest summit in the Huachuca Mountains. The mountain is composed of dacite tuff and granite. The slopes are covered by oak woodlands, silk tassel, sumac, pointleaf manzanita, agave, yucca, and sotol. Precipitation runoff from this peak's slopes drains east to the San Pedro River drainage basin. Topographic relief is significant as the summit rises 2,280 feet (695 meters) above Montezuma Canyon in 0.8 mile (1.3 km). Coronado Cave is set within the south slope of the peak. The nearest higher neighbor is Miller Peak, 2.5 miles (4.0 km) to the northwest. The mountain's toponym was officially adopted in 1959 by the U.S. Board on Geographic Names.

== Climate ==
According to the Köppen climate classification system, Montezuma Peak is located in a semi-arid climate zone with mild winters and hot summers. Summer starts off dry, but progressively gets wetter as the monsoon season approaches during the months of July and August. Summer nights are comfortably cool, and temperatures drop quickly after sunset. Winters are cold, but daytime highs are usually above freezing. Winter temperatures below 0 °F (−18 °C) are uncommon, though possible. This area receives less than 20 inches (510 millimeters) of annual rainfall, and snowfall is generally light during the winter.
