= Buckingham Park =

Buckingham Park may refer to:

- Buckingham Park, Buckinghamshire, United Kingdom
- Buckingham Park, California, United States
- Buckingham Park, New Jersey, United States
