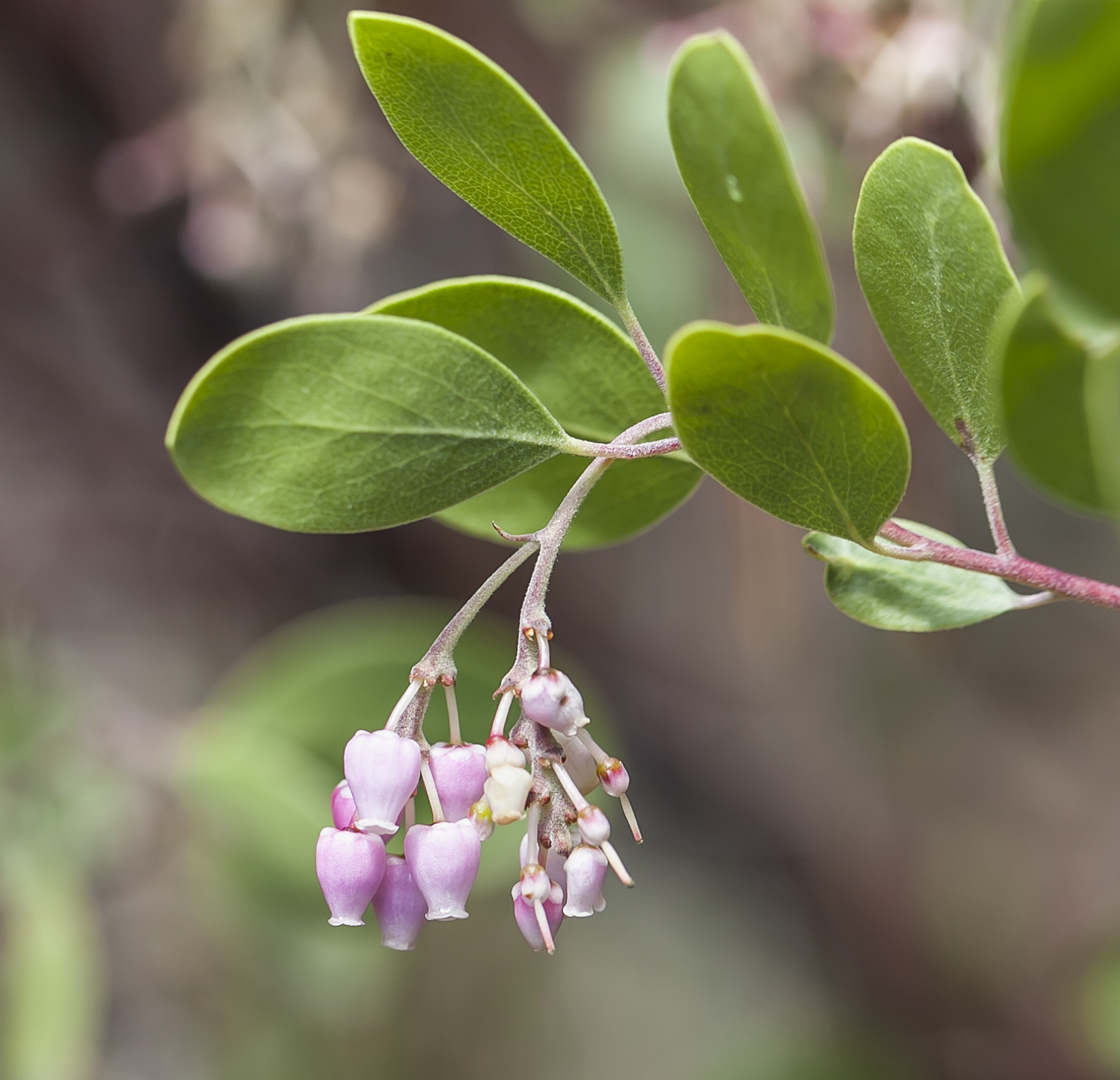

Scientific classification
- Kingdom: Plantae
- Clade: Tracheophytes
- Clade: Angiosperms
- Clade: Eudicots
- Clade: Asterids
- Order: Ericales
- Family: Ericaceae
- Genus: Arctostaphylos
- Species: A. manzanita
- Subspecies: A. m. subsp. elegans

Trinomial name
- Arctostaphylos manzanita subsp. elegans (Jeps.) P.V.Wells

Synonyms
- Arctostaphylos elegans Jeps.; Arctostaphylos manzanita var. elegans (Jeps.) L.D.Benson; Arctostaphylos pungens subsp. elegans (Jeps.) Roof; Uva-ursi elegans (Jeps.) A. Heller

= Arctostaphylos manzanita subsp. elegans =

Subspecies of flowering plant

Arctostaphylos manzanita subsp. elegans, also known as the Konocti manzanita, is a subspecies of the Common manzanita. It is endemic to California. It was originally described at the rank of species as Arctostaphylos elegans in 1893 by Willis Linn Jepson. It was reduced to a subspecies of Arctostaphylos manzanita by Philipp Vincent Wells in 1968.
