= Coronado Cave =

Cave in Cochise County, Arizona

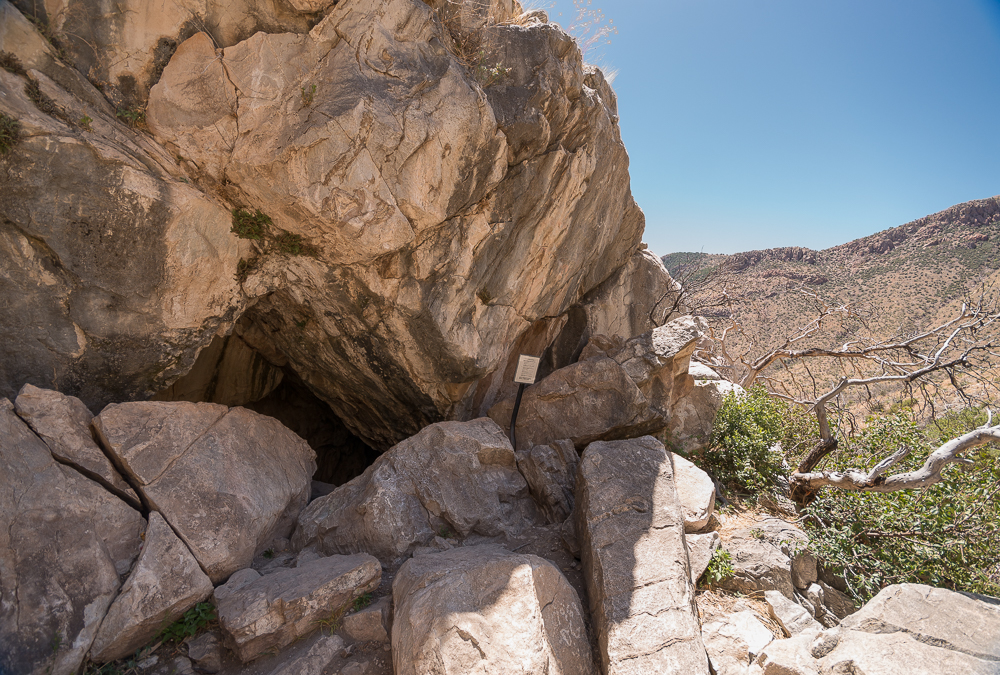
Coronado Cave Entrance

Coronado Cave (31°21′4″N 110°15′38″W) is located on the Coronado National Memorial in Cochise County in southern Arizona near the Mexican border. Walking in the cave is rather easy and the temperature is consistent. Some rooms require crawling in order to enter. The cave has both stalactites and stalagmites. The cave has been measured to be approximately 600 feet long, 70 feet wide and 20 feet tall with several passages and crawl ways.

== Access ==
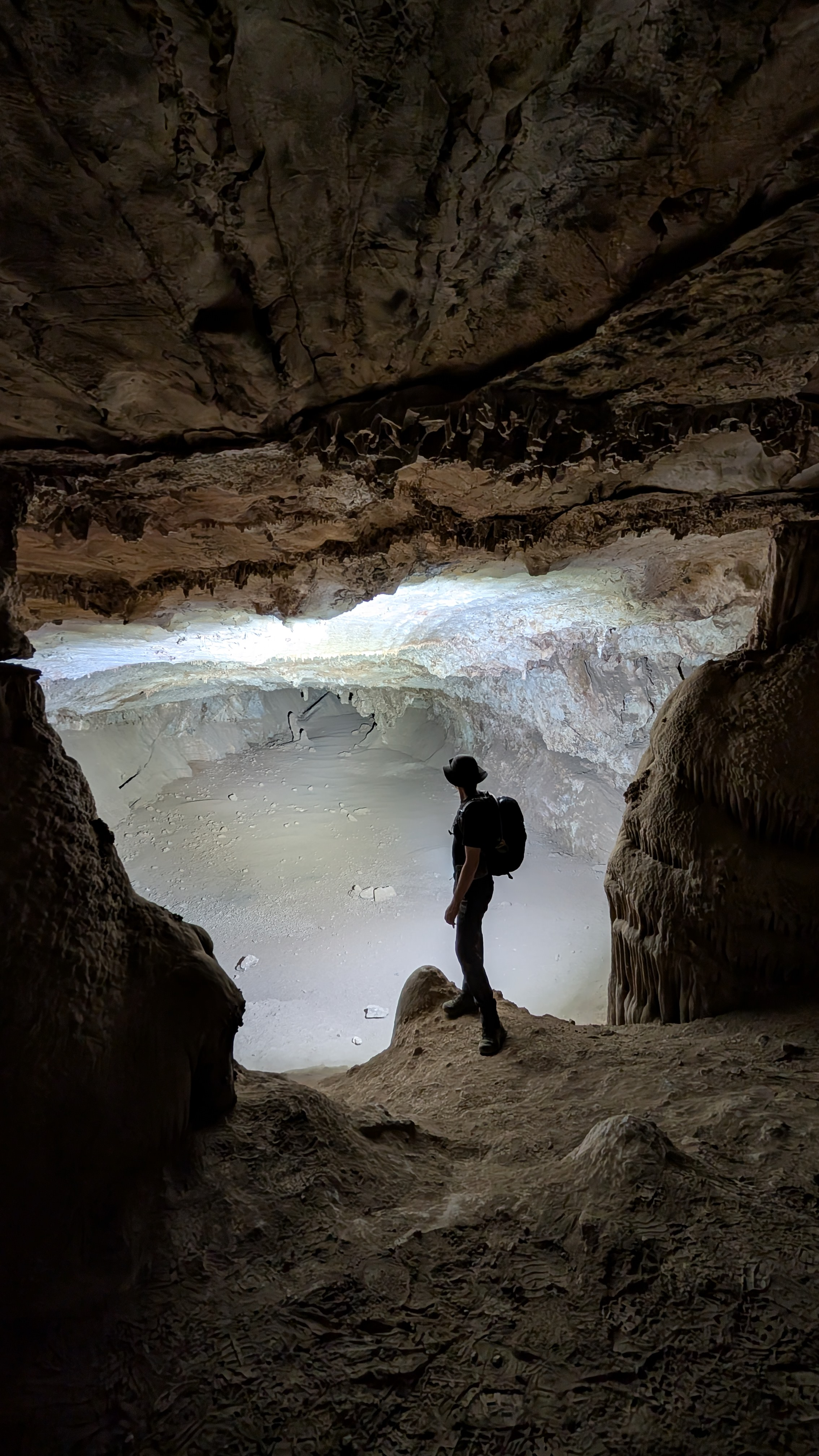
One of the large caverns found in Coronado Cave

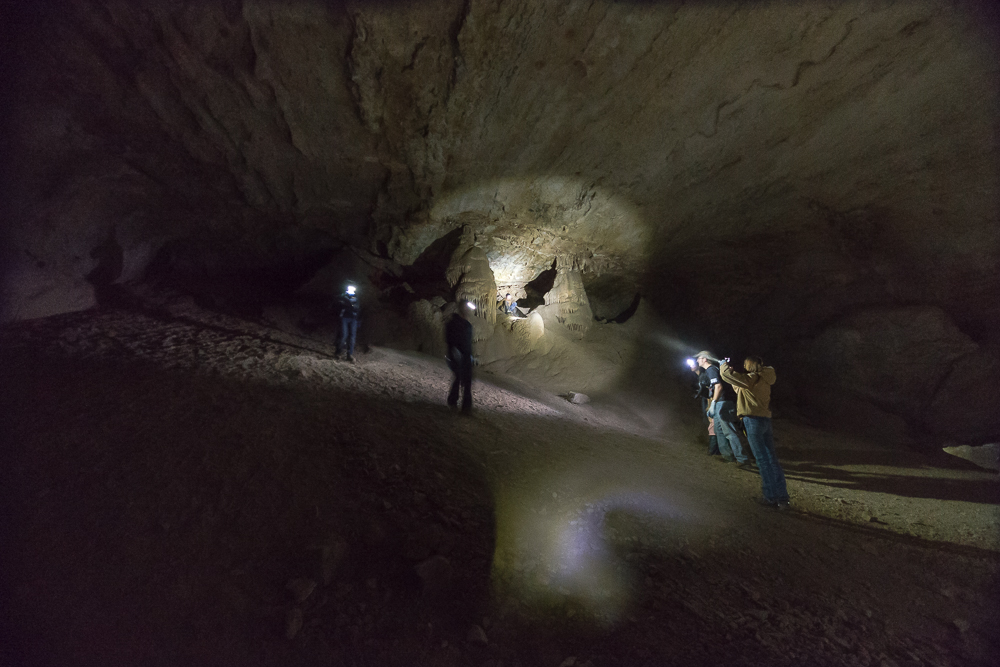
Interior of the cave

Visitors must stop at the visitor center and obtain a free cave permit. From the parking lot visitors can travel west on a well marked trail for 0.75 miles until reaching the cave.
