= Coronado National Memorial =

National memorial in Arizona, United States

- IUCN category III (natural monument or feature)
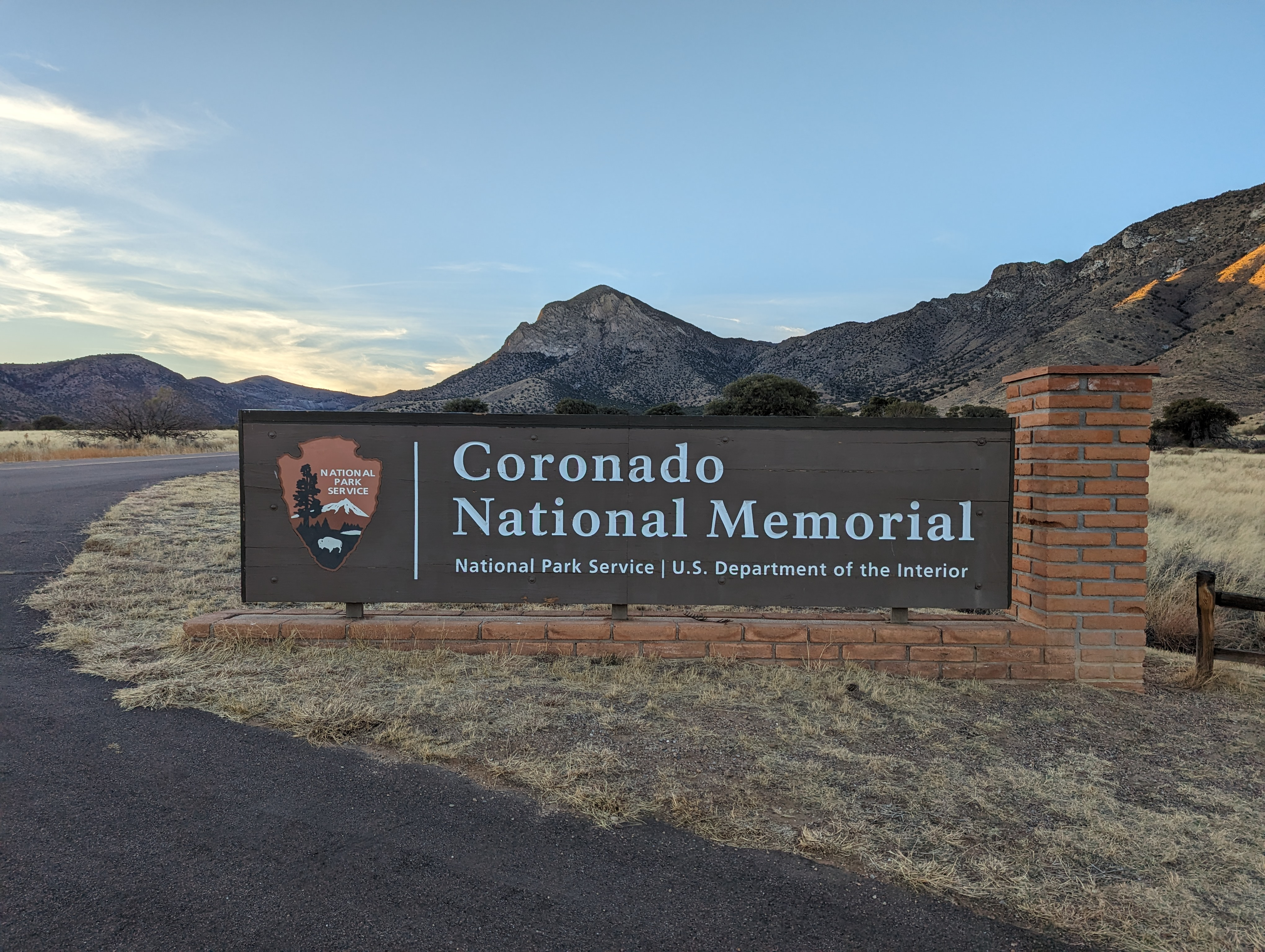
- Entrance to Coronado National Memorial

- Location within Arizona Location within the United States
- Location: Cochise County, Arizona, USA
- Nearest city: Sierra Vista, Arizona
- Coordinates: 31°20′54″N 110°16′18″W
- Area: 4,750.22 acres (19.2235 km^{2})
- Established: November 5, 1952
- Visitors: 179,216 (in 2025)
- Governing body: National Park Service
- Website: Coronado National Memorial

The Coronado National Memorial commemorates the first organized expedition into the Southwest by conquistador Francisco Vásquez de Coronado in 1540. The memorial is located in a natural setting on the Mexico–United States border on the southeast flank of the Huachuca Mountains south of Sierra Vista, Arizona and is bordered to the north and west by Coronado National Forest. Within the memorial is an overlook at Montezuma Pass where the Coronado expedition entered modern Arizona. The memorial confirms the ties that bind the United States and Mexico.

== History ==
Official statements indicate that it was initially designed as a gesture of goodwill and cooperation between the United States and Mexico, through the recognition of Coronado's 1540 expedition to the area. For example, in 1939 the House Committee on Foreign Affairs noted:

As a result of this expedition, what has been truly characterized by historians as one of the greatest land expeditions the world has known, a new civilization was established in the great American Southwest.

And E. K. Burlew, Acting Secretary of the Interior added in 1940:

To commemorate permanently the explorations of Francisco Vásquez de Coronado...would be of great value in advancing the relationship of the United States and Mexico upon a friendly basis of cultural understanding... [It would] stress the history and problems of the two countries and would encourage cooperation for the advancement of their common interests.

Thus the site was first designated Coronado International Memorial on August 18, 1941, with the hope that a comparable adjoining area would be established in Mexico. The arrangement might have been similar to the Waterton-Glacier International Peace Park between the United States and Canada. However, despite interest by the government of Mexico, the Mexican memorial was never created, therefore Congress changed the authorized designation to a national memorial on July 9, 1952. The memorial was established by Harry S. Truman on November 5 of that year. As with all historic areas administered by the National Park Service, the national memorial was listed on the National Register of Historic Places on October 15, 1966.

In December 2020, explosives and bulldozers were used to clear a path to improve the border barrier.

== Recreation ==
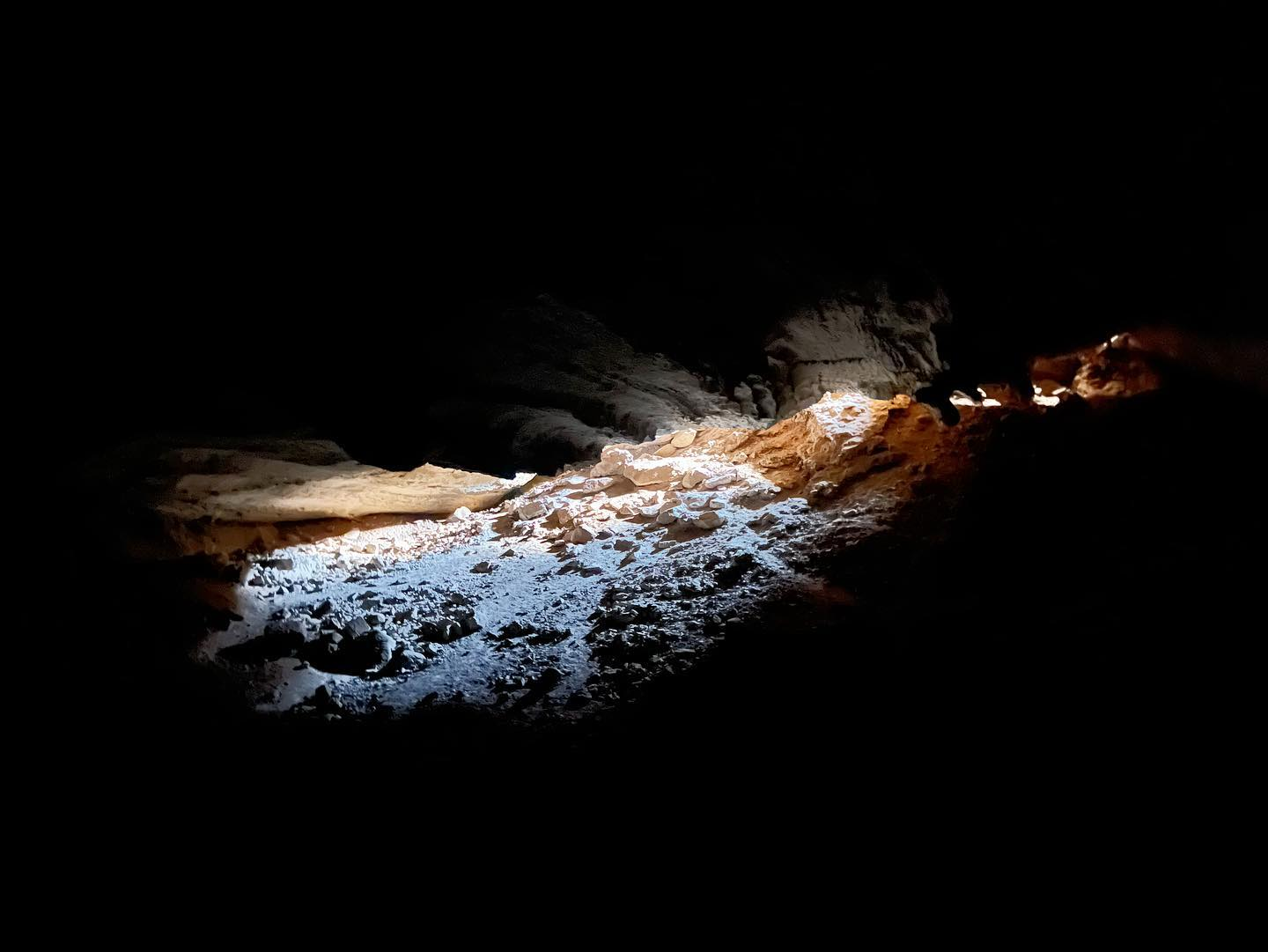
Sunlight near the entrance of Coronado Cave

The Memorial hosts eight miles (13 km) of hiking trails to accommodate a wide range of skill levels, ranging from an interpretive nature trail less than one mile round-trip, to a 6.2-mile trail (10.0 km) which gains more than 1,300 feet (400 m) in elevation and offers hikers a direct route to a border marker between the states of Arizona and Sonora.

After a 1978 park boundary expansion, the Memorial also began protecting Coronado Cave, a 600-foot-long cavern (180 m) containing a variety of formations and historic graffiti which visitors can explore independently. The cave is located within the south slope of Montezuma Peak, which is the highest point of Coronado National Memorial.

== Climate ==
According to the Köppen Climate Classification system, the Coronado National Memorial has a mediterranean climate. The hottest temperature recorded at the memorial was 106 °F (41.1 °C) on June 19, 2017, while the coldest temperature recorded was 1 °F (−17.2 °C) on December 8, 1978, and February 3, 2011.

Climate data for Coronado National Memorial, Arizona, 1991–2020 normals, extremes 1955–present
Month	Jan	Feb	Mar	Apr	May	Jun	Jul	Aug	Sep	Oct	Nov	Dec	Year
Record high °F (°C)	80 (27)	82 (28)	86 (30)	93 (34)	101 (38)	106 (41)	104 (40)	101 (38)	100 (38)	94 (34)	85 (29)	78 (26)	106 (41)
Mean maximum °F (°C)	69.4 (20.8)	72.7 (22.6)	79.5 (26.4)	84.7 (29.3)	92.8 (33.8)	99.2 (37.3)	97.7 (36.5)	93.9 (34.4)	90.7 (32.6)	86.0 (30.0)	77.2 (25.1)	70.3 (21.3)	100.2 (37.9)
Mean daily maximum °F (°C)	58.5 (14.7)	61.9 (16.6)	68.3 (20.2)	75.3 (24.1)	82.9 (28.3)	91.6 (33.1)	89.0 (31.7)	86.6 (30.3)	84.2 (29.0)	76.7 (24.8)	66.8 (19.3)	58.3 (14.6)	75.0 (23.9)
Daily mean °F (°C)	45.9 (7.7)	48.5 (9.2)	53.8 (12.1)	60.0 (15.6)	67.3 (19.6)	75.9 (24.4)	75.9 (24.4)	74.1 (23.4)	71.1 (21.7)	63.4 (17.4)	53.5 (11.9)	46.0 (7.8)	61.3 (16.3)
Mean daily minimum °F (°C)	33.2 (0.7)	35.2 (1.8)	39.3 (4.1)	44.8 (7.1)	51.6 (10.9)	60.3 (15.7)	62.7 (17.1)	61.5 (16.4)	58.0 (14.4)	50.0 (10.0)	40.3 (4.6)	33.6 (0.9)	47.5 (8.6)
Mean minimum °F (°C)	19.7 (−6.8)	21.1 (−6.1)	25.6 (−3.6)	30.0 (−1.1)	38.3 (3.5)	49.3 (9.6)	56.7 (13.7)	55.1 (12.8)	49.8 (9.9)	35.2 (1.8)	25.0 (−3.9)	19.6 (−6.9)	16.1 (−8.8)
Record low °F (°C)	6 (−14)	1 (−17)	11 (−12)	13 (−11)	27 (−3)	37 (3)	48 (9)	44 (7)	38 (3)	22 (−6)	12 (−11)	1 (−17)	1 (−17)
Average precipitation inches (mm)	1.58 (40)	1.53 (39)	0.97 (25)	0.29 (7.4)	0.23 (5.8)	0.85 (22)	4.56 (116)	4.75 (121)	2.13 (54)	1.17 (30)	0.84 (21)	1.85 (47)	20.75 (528.2)
Average snowfall inches (cm)	0.9 (2.3)	0.4 (1.0)	0.3 (0.76)	0.1 (0.25)	0.0 (0.0)	0.0 (0.0)	0.0 (0.0)	0.0 (0.0)	0.0 (0.0)	0.0 (0.0)	0.1 (0.25)	1.4 (3.6)	3.2 (8.16)
Average precipitation days (≥ 0.01 in)	5.5	5.3	4.1	1.7	1.7	3.8	14.4	14.4	7.2	3.7	3.0	5.3	70.1
Average snowy days (≥ 0.1 in)	0.4	0.3	0.2	0.1	0.0	0.0	0.0	0.0	0.0	0.0	0.1	0.4	1.5
Source 1: NOAA
Source 2: National Weather Service

== Gallery ==
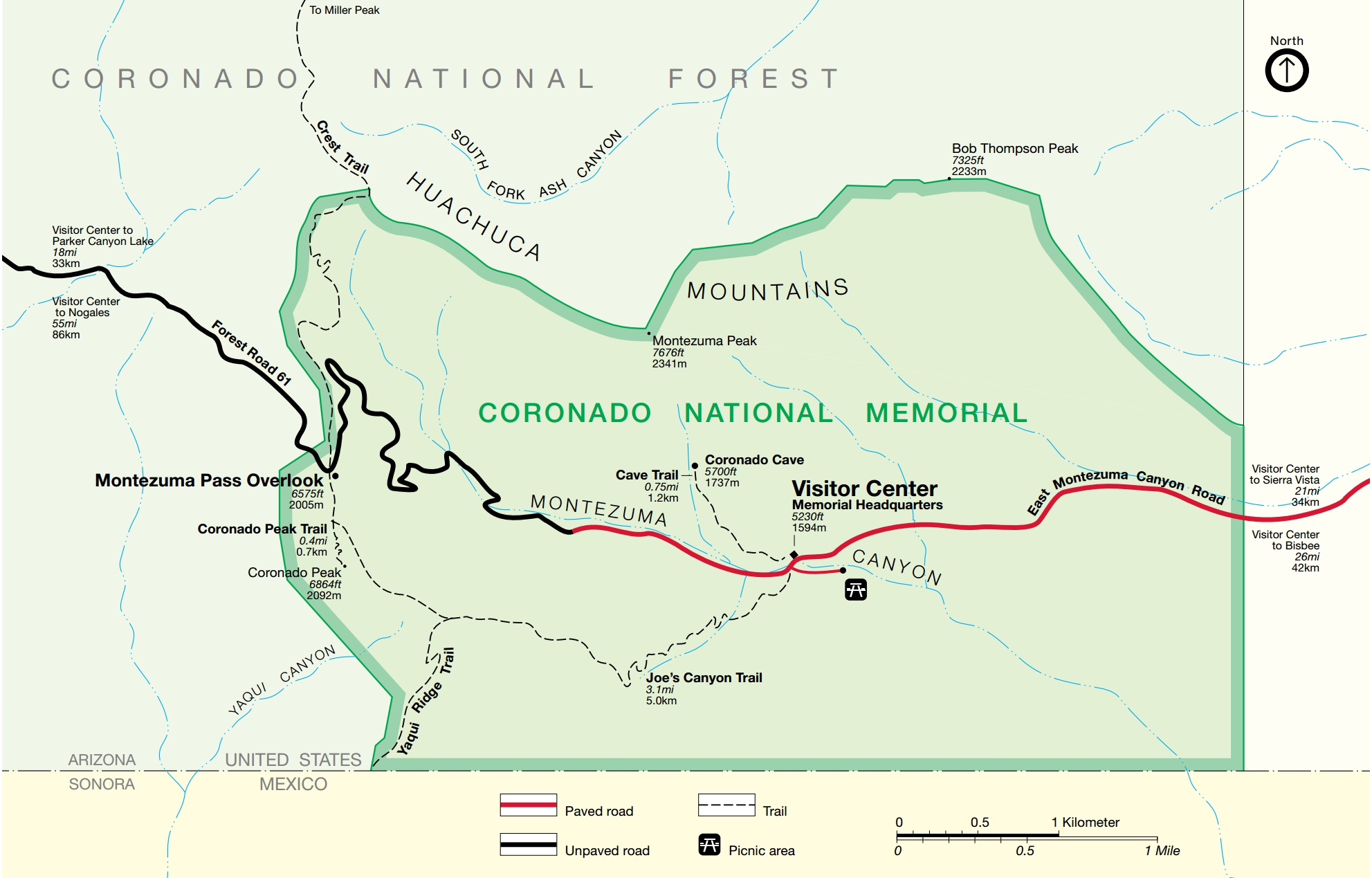
NPS park map

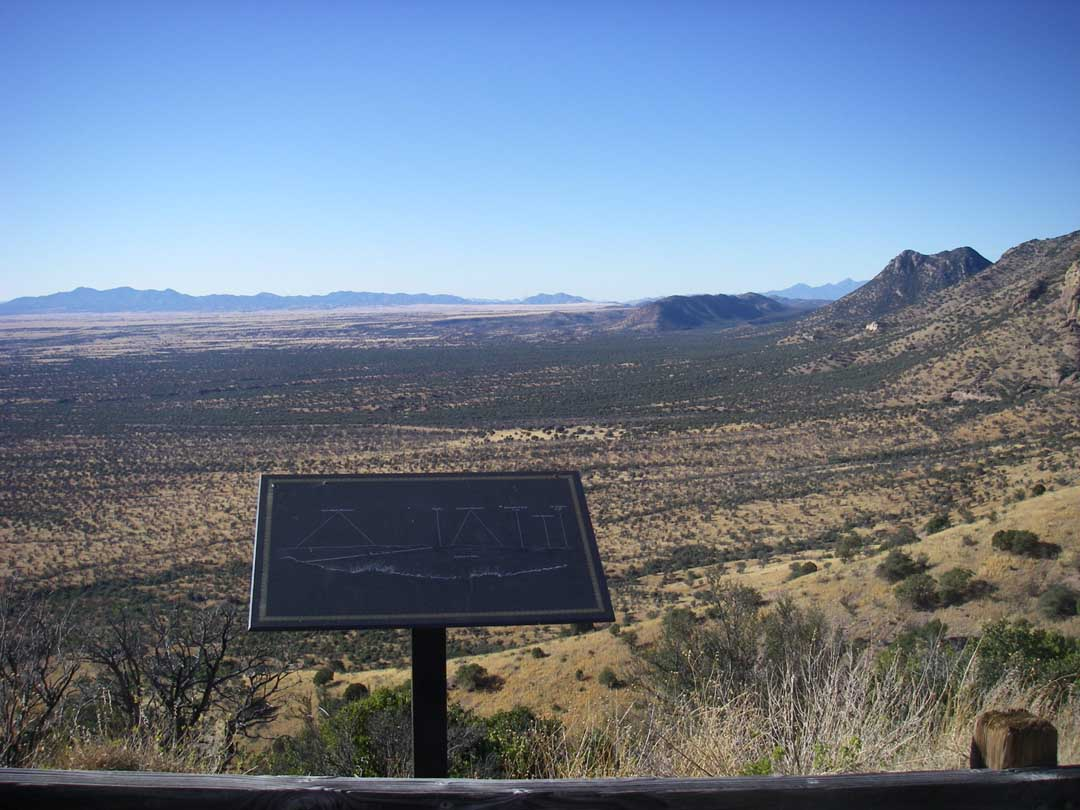
View from Montezuma Pass looking south & west into Mexico

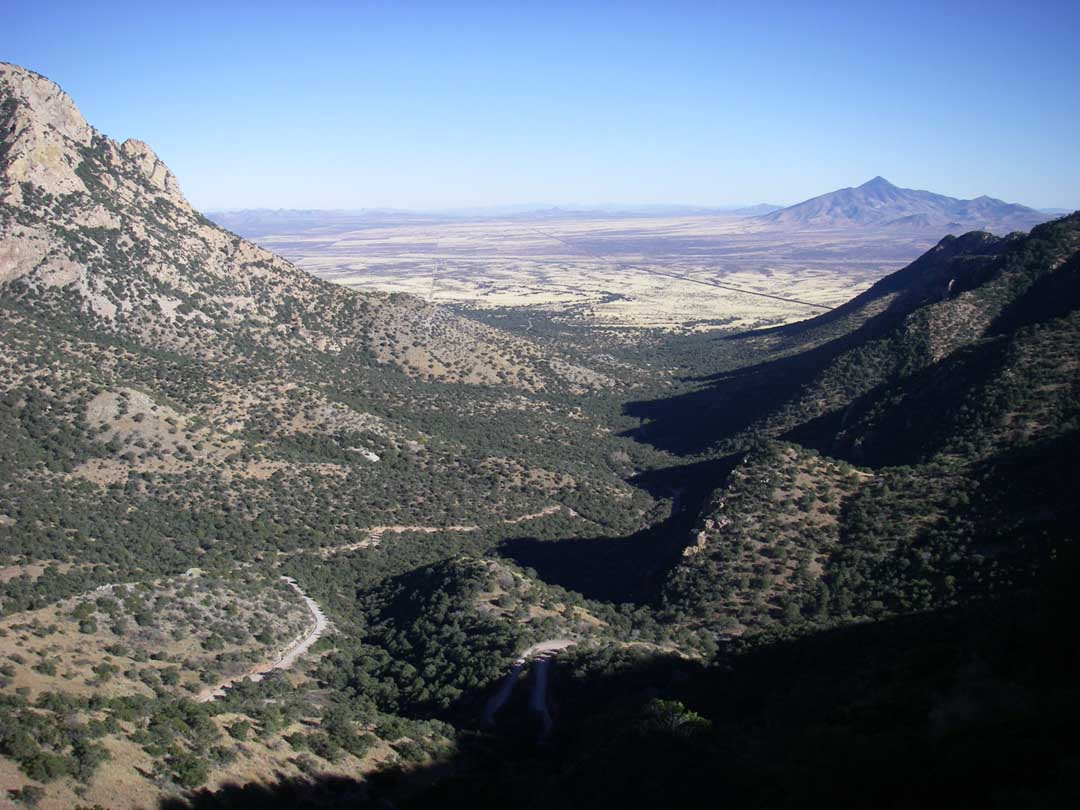
View from Montezuma Pass looking east

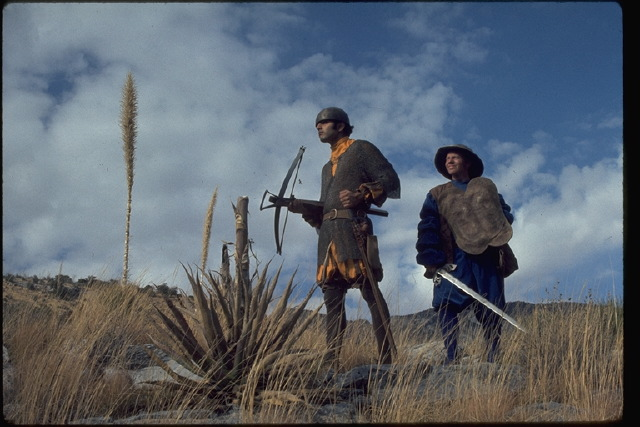
Reenactment of Coronado's entrada, 1540

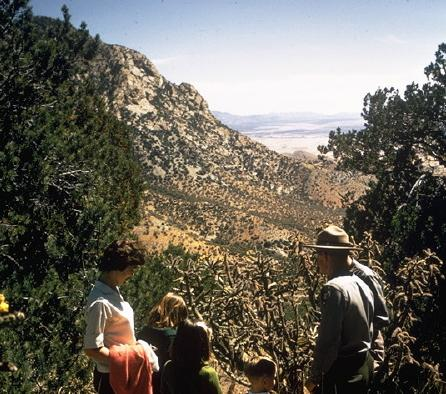
Visitors at Coronado National Memorial

== See also ==
- List of national memorials of the United States
