= Gil Nelson =

American botanist

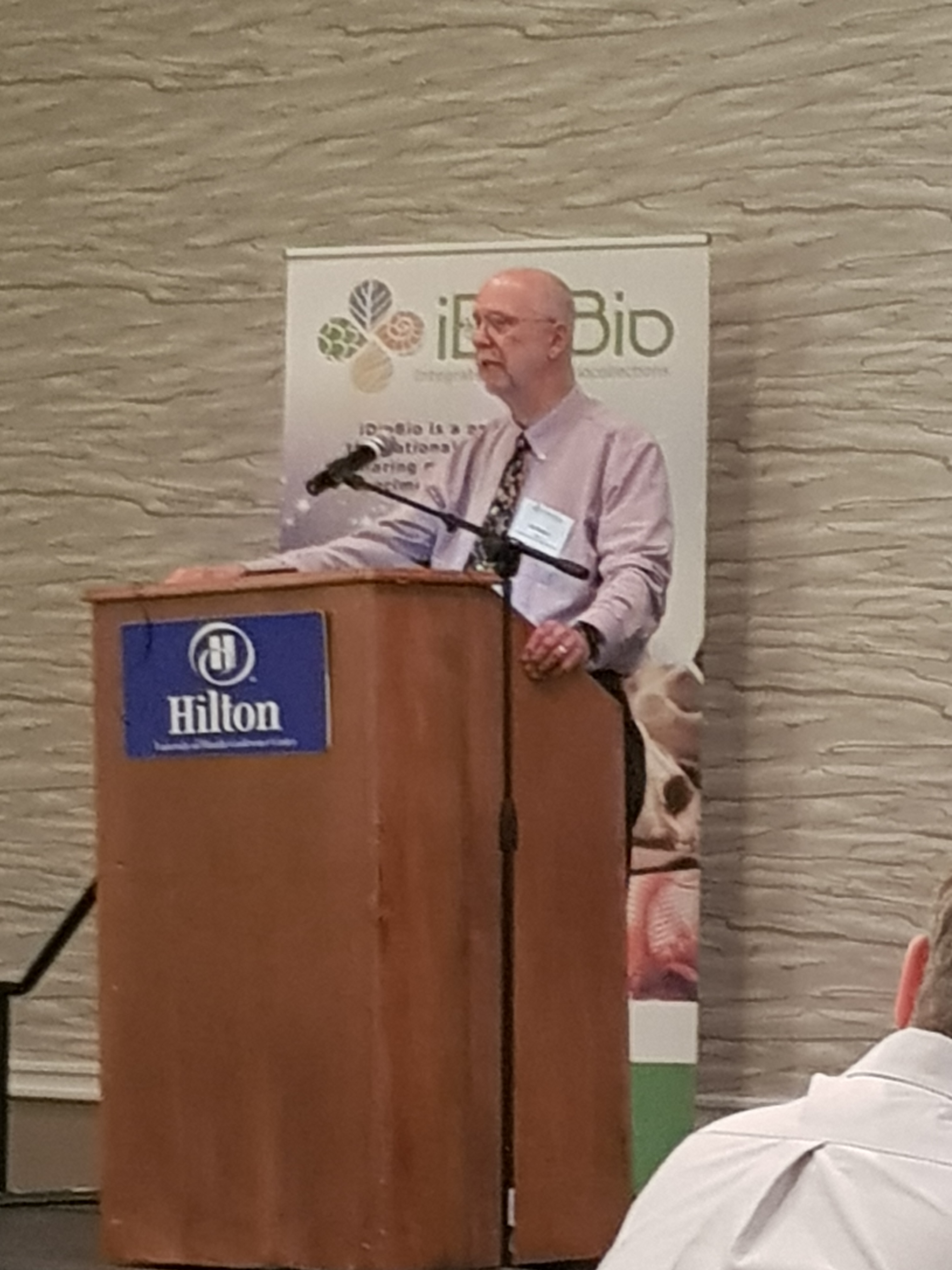
- Scientific career
- Fields: botany
- Institutions: Florida State University
- Website: www.gilnelson.com

Gil Nelson (born 1949) is a botanist, naturalist, author and speaker in the Southeastern United States.

== Bibliography ==
- The Trees of Florida 2010 – 480 pages
- Best Native Plants for Southern Gardens: A Handbook for Gardeners 2010 – 352 pages
- National Wildlife Federation Field Guide to Trees of North America with Bruce Kershner and Craig Tufts 2008 – 528 pages
- Atlantic Coastal Plain Wildflowers: A Guide to Common Wildflowers 2006 – 272 pages
- East Gulf Coastal Plain Wildflowers: A Field Guide... 2005 - 263 pages (A guide to the common wildflowers in the Gulf Coastal region of Georgia, Florida, Alabama, and Mississippi including 300 color photographs)
- Florida's best native landscape plants 2003 – 411 pages
- The ferns of Florida: a reference and field guide 2000 – 208 pages
- The shrubs and woody vines of Florida: a reference and field guide 1996 – 392 pages
- Exploring wild northwest Florida 1995 – 270 pages
- Exploring wild north Florida 1995 – 244 pages
