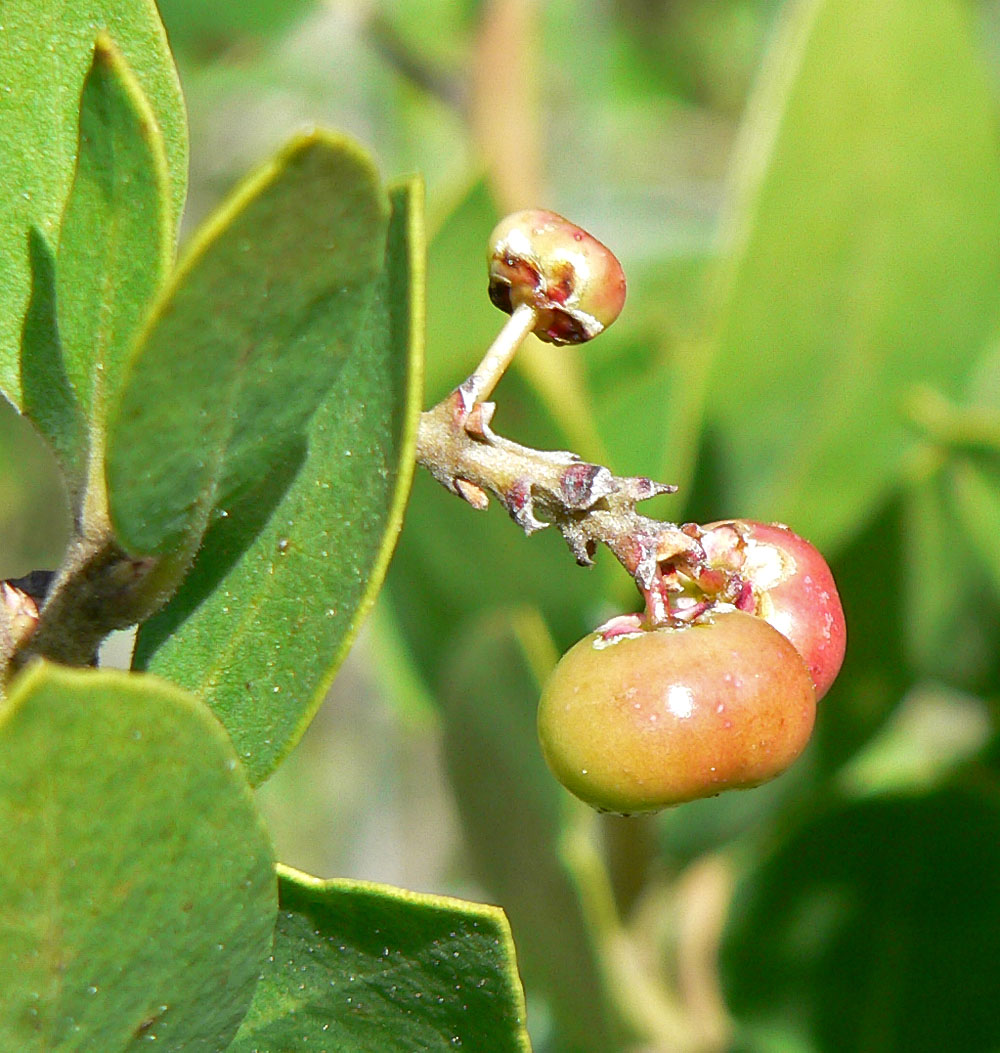

Scientific classification
- Kingdom: Plantae
- Clade: Tracheophytes
- Clade: Angiosperms
- Clade: Eudicots
- Clade: Asterids
- Order: Ericales
- Family: Ericaceae
- Genus: Arctostaphylos
- Species: A. manzanita

Binomial name
- Arctostaphylos manzanita Parry

= Arctostaphylos manzanita =

Species of tree

One of many species of manzanita, Arctostaphylos manzanita has the common names common manzanita and whiteleaf manzanita.

Arctostaphylos manzanita is endemic to California, where it can be found in the Coast Ranges and Sierra Nevada foothills. It is common on chaparral slopes and low-elevation coniferous forest ecosystems.

== Description ==
The Arctostaphylos manzanita leaves are bright shiny green, wedge-shaped and pointed. The small white flowers, only a quarter inch long, are cup-shaped and hang upside down. The fruits are berries which are white when new and turn red-brown as the summer wears on. The bark on the long, crooked branches is reddish, making the shrub easily identifiable as a manzanita. It grows into a twisted tree about 15 feet tall.

Like other manzanitas, this species has a hard, attractive wood that has proved useful for making tools and as firewood. The fruit is edible and has a pleasant tartness, but the seeds cause gastrointestinal upset if eaten in large quantities. It has historically been brewed into a cider, including by Native Americans. They are also consumed by bears and chipmunks.

== Subspecies ==
There are several subspecies:

- A. m. elegans - Konocti manzanita
- A. m. glaucescens - Whiteleaf manzanita
- A. m. laevigata - Contra Costa manzanita
- A. m. manzanita - Whiteleaf manzanita
- A. m. roofii - Roof's manzanita
- A. m. wieslanderi - Wieslander's manzanita

== See also ==
- California chaparral and woodlands ecoregion
