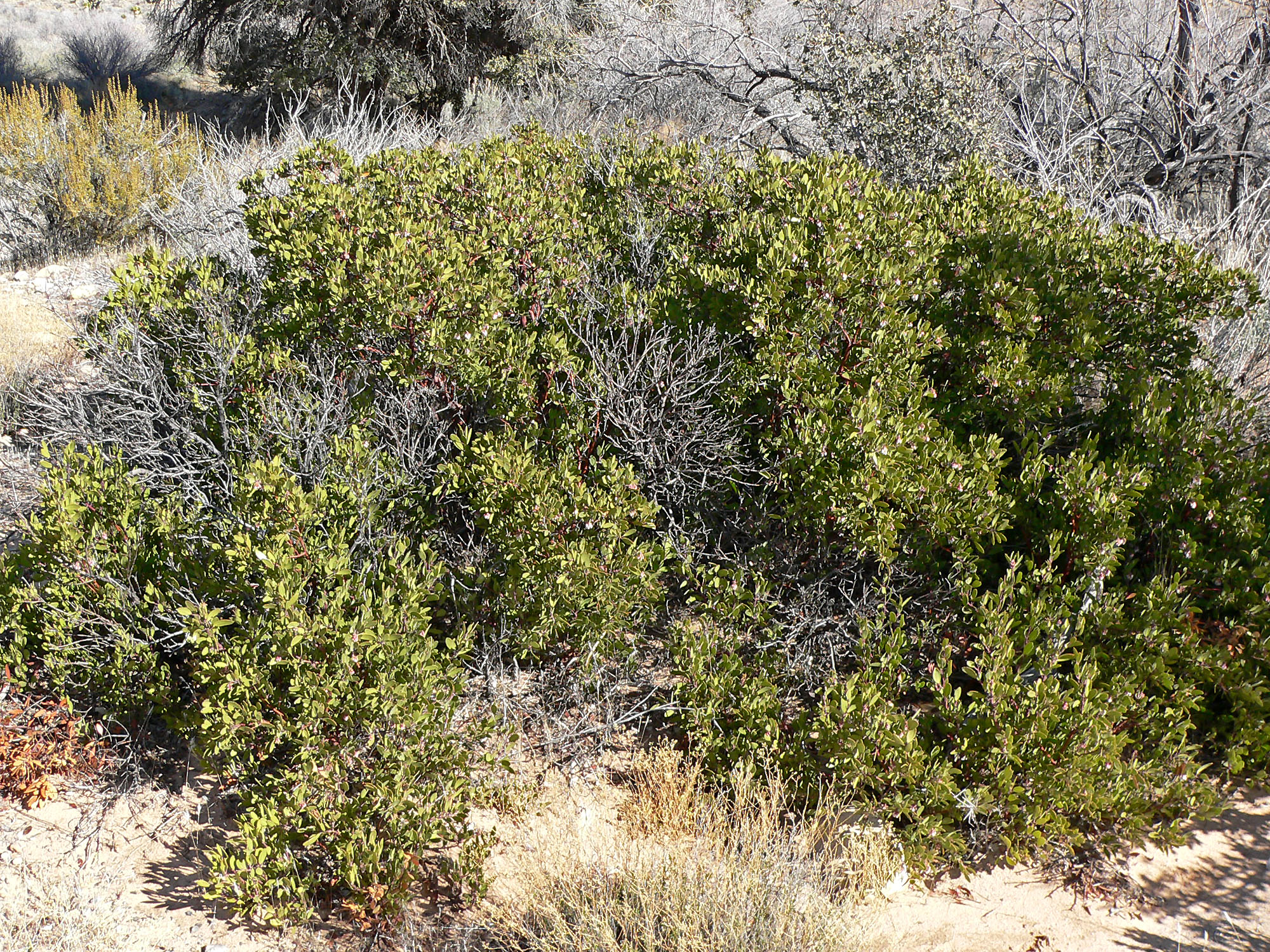

Conservation status
- Least Concern (IUCN 3.1)

Scientific classification
- Kingdom: Plantae
- Clade: Tracheophytes
- Clade: Angiosperms
- Clade: Eudicots
- Clade: Asterids
- Order: Ericales
- Family: Ericaceae
- Genus: Arctostaphylos
- Species: A. pungens

Binomial name
- Arctostaphylos pungens Kunth

Synonyms
- Arctostaphylos chaloneorum Arctostaphylos pseudopungens

= Arctostaphylos pungens =

Pointleaf manzanita

Species of tree

Arctostaphylos pungens, with the common name pointleaf manzanita, is a species of manzanita. It is native to the Southwestern United States and to northern and central Mexico, where it grows in chaparral and woodland habitats, and on desert ridges. Arctostaphylos pungens can be seen growing at Tent Rocks National Monument in New Mexico at an elevation of about 6000 feet.

== Description ==
Arctostaphylos pungens is an erect, spreading, evergreen shrub growing to heights between one and three meters. It has smooth red bark. Its smaller twigs and new leaves are lightly woolly. Mature leaves are leathery, shiny and green, oval to widely lance-shaped, and up to 4 centimeters long. The inflorescence is a spherical cluster of urn-shaped manzanita flowers. The fruit is a drupe 5 to 8 millimeters wide.

It is a food source for many kinds of wildlife, and it is harvested by people and made into jam in many parts of Mexico.

This shrub thrives in dry, shallow, acidic soils heavy with gravel and sand, and forms relationships with mycorrhizae to obtain extra nutrients and water. The seeds require scarification by wildfire before they are able to germinate.
