= Buckingham Park, California =

Unincorporated community in Lake County, California

Buckingham Park
- Incorporated community
- Location in California Buckingham Park (the United States)
- Coordinates: 39°00′56″N 122°45′29″W
- Country: United States
- State: California
- County: Lake
- Elevation: 1,414 ft (431 m)

Buckingham Park (formerly Buckingham Peninsula) is an unincorporated community in Lake County, California, United States. It is located on the south shore of Clear Lake, on the peninsula just south of The Narrows and 4.8 mi (7.7 km) northeast of Kelseyville, 9 miles (14 km) east-southeast of Lakeport, at an elevation of 1,414 feet (431 m). The community was established as an "exclusive subdivision" of lakeside properties in 1930.

The name is derived from a family who lived at the site in the 1880s and 1890s.
