= Soda Bay, California =

- Census-designated place
- Location in California
- Coordinates: 39°00′04″N 122°47′21″W
- Country: United States
- State: California
- County: Lake

Area
  - Total: 1.285 sq mi (3.328 km^{2})
  - Land: 1.285 sq mi (3.328 km^{2})
  - Water: 0 sq mi (0 km^{2}) 0%
- Elevation: 1,398 ft (426 m)

Population (2020)
  - Total: 1,163
  - Density: 905.1/sq mi (349.5/km^{2})
- Time zone: UTC-8 (Pacific (PST))
  - Summer (DST): UTC-7 (PDT)
- Area code: 707
- GNIS feature IDs: 1659810; 2583147

Soda Bay is a census-designated place in Lake County, California, United States. It is located on Clear Lake, 7.5 miles (12 km) east-southeast of Lakeport, at an elevation of 1,398 feet (426 m). The population was 1,163 at the 2020 census.

A resort at the place, called Soda Bay Springs, could by 1910 accommodate 150 guests.

== Geography ==
According to the United States Census Bureau, the CDP has a total area of 1.3 square miles (3.4 km^{2}), all land.

== Demographics ==
Historical population
| Census | Pop. | Note | %± |
|---|---|---|---|
| 2020 | 1,163 | | — |
U.S. Decennial Census; 1860–1870 1880-1890; 1900 1910 1920; 1930 1940 1950; 1960 1970 1980; 1990 2000 2010

=== 2020 census ===
As of the 2020 census, Soda Bay had a population of 1,163.

The whole population lived in households. There were 524 households, out of which 91 (17.4%) had children under the age of 18 living in them, 195 (37.2%) were married-couple households, 42 (8.0%) were cohabiting couple households, 152 (29.0%) had a female householder with no partner present, and 135 (25.8%) had a male householder with no partner present. 213 households (40.6%) were one person, and 111 (21.2%) were one person aged 65 or older. The average household size was 2.22. There were 261 families (49.8% of all households).

The age distribution was 189 people (16.3%) under the age of 18, 66 people (5.7%) aged 18 to 24, 227 people (19.5%) aged 25 to 44, 346 people (29.8%) aged 45 to 64, and 335 people (28.8%) who were 65 years of age or older. The median age was 53.8 years. For every 100 females, there were 99.8 males, and for every 100 females age 18 and over there were 95.6 males age 18 and over.

There were 710 housing units, of which 524 (73.8%) were occupied and 186 (26.2%) were vacant. Of the occupied units, 399 (76.1%) were owner-occupied and 125 (23.9%) were occupied by renters. The homeowner vacancy rate was 4.2% and the rental vacancy rate was 13.5%.

100.0% of residents lived in urban areas, while 0.0% lived in rural areas.

Racial composition as of the 2020 census
| Race | Number | Percent |
|---|---|---|
| White | 843 | 72.5% |
| Black or African American | 28 | 2.4% |
| American Indian and Alaska Native | 33 | 2.8% |
| Asian | 30 | 2.6% |
| Native Hawaiian and Other Pacific Islander | 0 | 0.0% |
| Some other race | 100 | 8.6% |
| Two or more races | 129 | 11.1% |
| Hispanic or Latino (of any race) | 182 | 15.6% |
