= Sergey Eylanbekov =

Russian-American sculptor

Portrait

Sergey Eylanbekov is a Russian-American sculptor. He was born in 1960 in the Soviet Union. He studied at the Moscow School of Fine Arts and later at the Surikov Moscow State Academic Art Institute, from which he graduated with honors in 1984. During his studies, several of his works were acquired by Russian state museums. He emigrated to the United States in 1989, settling in New York, and became a U.S. citizen.

== Career ==
After moving to the United States, Eylanbekov initially supported himself by producing reproductions of classical sculptures for museums before establishing himself with original commissioned work. In 2004, his cast-acrylic sculpture Five Continents represented the United States in the International Olympic Committee's Sport Art Competition, and he was named Sport Artist of the Year by the United States Sports Academy that year (an honor he received again in 2020).

=== Dwight D. Eisenhower Memorial ===
Dwight D. Eisenhower National Memorial in Washington D.C.

Eylanbekov was commissioned to create the bronze figures and bas-reliefs for the Dwight D. Eisenhower Memorial in Washington, D.C., designed by Frank Gehry. Working from a studio in Pietrasanta, Italy, he sculpted the nine-foot bronze statue of Eisenhower and groups of paratroopers from the 101st Airborne Division, inspired by a 1944 photograph of Eisenhower addressing troops before the Normandy landings. The installation of the bronzes in January 2020 was the subject of an in-depth feature in The Washington Post, which described Eylanbekov's working process and included interview material with the sculptor; the article was subsequently syndicated by several U.S. regional newspapers. The memorial was dedicated in September 2020; coverage of the dedication in The Washington Times described the bronze figures created by Eylanbekov depicting Eisenhower with paratroopers and later as president with his staff.

Dwight D. Eisenhower National Memorial in Washington D.C.

Dwight D. Eisenhower National Memorial in Washington D.C.

=== Hancock Adams Common ===
Eylanbekov created the bronze statues of John Hancock and John Adams for the dedication of the Hancock Adams Common in Quincy, Massachusetts, in 2018, an event covered by CBS Boston. In 2022, he completed a statue of Abigail Adams for the same site; the unveiling was reported by CBS Boston with additional reporting contributed by the Associated Press.

=== Other work ===
Sergey Eylanbekov – sculpture of St. Michael for Public Safety Headquarters Building facade in Quincy, MA Work in clay

Eylanbekov's other public commissions include a monumental bronze sculpture, Peer Gynt and Three Herd Girls, unveiled in Oslo, Norway, in 2010, and a portrait sculpture of Pelé presented at the Africa Cup of Nations in Gabon in 2012. His work has been exhibited at the Moscow Museum of Modern Art and at United Nations headquarters in New York. He is a Fellow of the National Sculpture Society and has served on its board of directors.

== Personal life ==
Eylanbekov lives on Long Island, New York, and maintains a studio in Pietrasanta, Italy.
