= National Civic Art Society =

Nonprofit organization in the United States

The National Civic Art Society is a nonprofit organization that advocates and promotes public art, architecture, and urbanism in the classical tradition and opposes the inclusion of modern and contemporary architectural styles. The organization is headquartered in Washington, D.C., United States.

== History and operations ==
The society has various regional chapters that host local events and outreach.

The society has been active in discussions regarding memorials in Washington, D.C., and the rebuilding of the original Penn Station in New York City. The society led a six-year campaign against architect Frank Gehry's proposed design for the Dwight D. Eisenhower Memorial, which forced the architect to make changes to his original scheme.

The society is backing a proposal to build a new classical Pennsylvania Station in New York City.

In 2020, the society organized a survey of 2,000 American adults by The Harris Poll to determine people's preferred architecture for federal buildings and U.S. courthouses. The survey showed participants pairs of side-by-side photographs of federal buildings similar in shape, size, and color, with one of the buildings being traditional, the other modern. As Bloomberg reported, "The responses did not vary by demographic group: When asked to choose from the two images, Americans of every age, sex, race and class category pulled the lever for traditional designs by a nearly three to one margin. Overall, classical won out over modern by 72% to 28%."

=== Leadership ===
The National Civic Art Society's president is Justin Shubow, chairman of the U.S. Department of Transportation's Beautifying Transportation Infrastructure Council, and a former chairman of the United States Commission of Fine Arts. Under his leadership, the society is reported to have played a key role in the passage of the executive order "Promoting Beautiful Federal Civic Architecture", which encourages traditional and classical architecture for federal buildings.

== See also ==
- Classical order
- Classical architecture
- Traditional architecture
- New Classical architecture
