= Justin Shubow =

American art critic

Justin Benjamin Shubow

Chair of the U.S. Commission of Fine Arts
- In office January 2021 – June 2021
- President: Joe Biden
- Preceded by: Earl A. Powell III

Personal details
- Spouse: Idris Leppla
- Education: Columbia University (BA); University of Michigan (MA); Yale University (JD)

Justin Shubow is an American architectural critic who currently serves as the president of the National Civic Art Society, a nonprofit organization that advocates and promotes public art and architecture in the classical tradition. He is chairman of the U.S. Department of Transportation’s Beautifying Transportation Infrastructure Council. He was a member of the United States Commission of Fine Arts from 2018 to 2021 and served as its chairman in 2021, being the first Jewish person to hold that position. The New York Times has called him “one of modern architecture’s biggest critics.”

== Biography ==
Shubow graduated, magna cum laude, from Columbia University in 1999, where he was drum major of the Columbia University Marching Band, and received a master’s degree in philosophy from the University of Michigan and a J.D. degree from Yale Law School.

He served as an instructor at the University of Michigan and Yale University teaching courses in philosophy. He also served as an editor of The Forward newspaper and Commentary magazine.

=== Architectural Advocacy ===
Shubow has been a proponent of Classical architecture and is critical of Brutalist architecture. He is known for his criticism and lobbying against Frank Gehry's Dwight D. Eisenhower Memorial. He helped draft and played a key role in the passage of President Trump's 2020 Executive Order "Promoting Beautiful Federal Civic Architecture," which encouraged traditional and classical architecture for federal buildings.

In November 2018, he was nominated by President Donald Trump to serve on the United States Commission of Fine Arts, an independent federal agency that oversees the design and construction of all buildings, monuments, and memorials in Washington, D.C.

On January 25, 2021, he was named chairman of the commission, succeeding Earl A. Powell III, former director of the National Gallery of Art.

In May 2021, he was removed from the commission by President Joe Biden. Shubow issued a statement to the White House, saying, "As chairman of the US Commission of Fine Arts, I was shocked and dismayed to learn that three of my fellow commissioners, along with myself, have been asked to resign or be terminated by the President. In the Commission’s 110-year history, no commissioner has ever been removed by a President, let alone the commission’s chairman. Any such removal would set a terrible precedent.”

In December 2024 and January 2025, Martha MacCallum on Fox News Radio and the Chicago Tribune and reported that he is being considered for the position of chairman of the National Endowment for the Arts in the second Trump administration.

Under his leadership, the National Civic Art Society is backing a proposal to build a new classical Pennsylvania Station in New York City.

In January 2026, U.S. Secretary of Transportation Sean Duffy appointed Shubow as the inaugural chair of the Beautifying Transportation Infrastructure Council, a federal advisory body created to advise the Department of Transportation on design and aesthetic standards for major transportation infrastructure projects.

== Personal life ==
He is married to Idris Leppla, an Assistant Professor of Psychiatry and Behavioral Sciences at Johns Hopkins University. He is of Jewish descent.
