= Dwight D. Eisenhower Memorial =

U.S. national memorial in Washington, D.C.

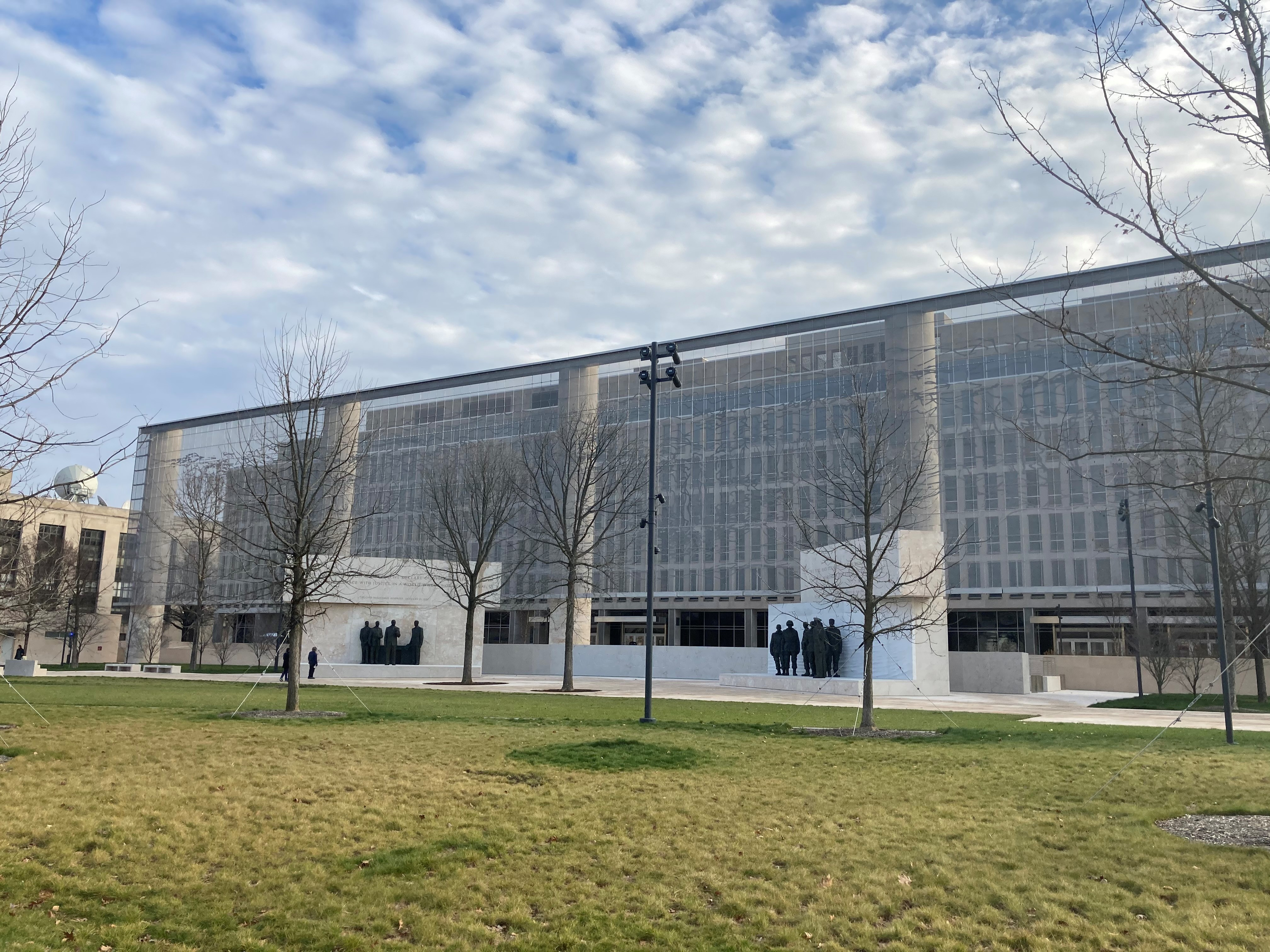
- The memorial in December 2020

- Location within Central Washington, D.C. Location within the United States
- Location: District of Columbia, U.S.
- Nearest city: Washington, D.C.
- Coordinates: 38°53′14″N 77°01′08″W
- Established: September 17, 2020
- Visitors: 760,603 (in 2022)
- Governing body: National Park Service
- Website: Dwight D. Eisenhower Memorial

The Dwight D. Eisenhower Memorial is a United States presidential memorial in Washington, D.C. honoring Dwight David Eisenhower, the Supreme Commander of the Allied Forces in Europe during World War II and the 34th president of the United States.

Located to the south of the National Mall, the national memorial is set in a park-like plaza, with large columns framing a mesh tapestry depicting the site of the Normandy landings, and sculptures and bas-reliefs arrayed in the park. Architect Frank Gehry designed the memorial and Sergey Eylanbekov sculpted the bronze statues of Eisenhower in various settings. The memorial's tapestry artist was Tomas Osinski, and the inscription artist, Nicholas Waite Benson.

On October 25, 1999, the United States Congress created the Dwight D. Eisenhower Memorial Commission, and charged it with creating "...an appropriate permanent memorial to Dwight D. Eisenhower...to perpetuate his memory and his contributions to the United States." Originally designed as a "roofless" temple outlined by large columns, and mesh tapestry "walls", the preliminary design proved controversial. After several years of hearings and several design changes by Gehry, including reducing the number of columns and tapestries, final design approvals were given in 2017, and the groundbreaking ceremony was held at the 4-acre (1.6 ha) site on November 3 of that year, which was attended by dignitaries. The dedication ceremony was initially scheduled for May 8, 2020, the 75th anniversary of Victory in Europe Day, but was postponed to September 17, 2020, due to the COVID-19 pandemic.

== Authorizing a memorial and establishing a memorial commission ==
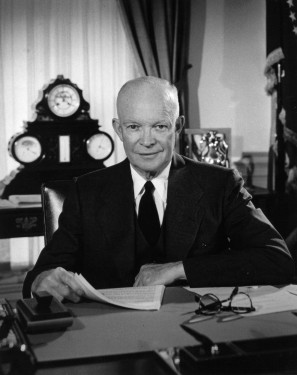
U.S. president Dwight D. Eisenhower earlier commanded Allied forces in World War II.

Three individuals were behind the successful effort to establish a memorial to President Dwight D. Eisenhower: Rocco Siciliano, Senator Daniel Inouye (D-Hawaii), and Senator Ted Stevens (R-Alaska).

Siciliano, a Roman Catholic, Italian American born in Utah, was called to active duty as a private in 1943 while a ROTC student. Promoted quickly to first lieutenant in the United States Army, he was awarded a Bronze Star for valor for his actions as part of the 87th Mountain Infantry Regiment during the Italian Campaign. A graduate of Georgetown Law School, he worked for the National Labor Relations Board from 1948 to 1950, and was appointed by Eisenhower in 1953 to be the Assistant Secretary of Labor for employment and manpower activities. In 1957, Eisenhower made Siciliano his Special Assistant to the President for Personnel Management. In 1958, he engineered a meeting between Eisenhower and African American leaders of the civil rights movement: Lester Granger, Martin Luther King Jr., A. Philip Randolph, and Roy Wilkins.

After decades of public service, Siciliano became head of the Eisenhower Institute in the 1990s. The 50th anniversary of the Normandy landings and the approach of the 50th anniversary of Eisenhower's election as president increased interest in the 34th president. In 1999, his last year as the institute's chairman, Siciliano decided to push for a memorial to Eisenhower.

Siciliano knew Senator Stevens, a highly decorated World War II Army Air Forces pilot who had worked in the Department of the Interior during the Eisenhower administration and who had proved critical in winning statehood for Alaska. The Eisenhower Institute had also honored Stevens with its Eisenhower Leadership Prize in 1999. Siciliano broached the idea of a memorial with Stevens. Stevens suggested a bipartisan effort and brought Senator Inouye into the effort. Inouye had served in Italy with the segregated 442nd Infantry Combat Regiment, losing his right forearm in combat, and later being awarded the Medal of Honor. Siciliano worked with Stevens and Inouye to write the legislation that would authorize a memorial and establish a memorial commission.

Senators Stevens and Inouye were both appointed to the conference committee to reconcile the House and Senate versions of the Department of Defense Appropriations Act in 1999. The conferees inserted language (Section 8162) to authorize the memorial and establish the Dwight D. Eisenhower Memorial Commission into the conference report. The House approved the appropriations act 372-to-55 on October 13, and the Senate followed by a vote of 87-to-11 on October 14. President Bill Clinton signed the bill into law (P.L. 106–79) on October 25, 1999.

Bill P.L. 106-79 appropriated $300,000 to fund the commission's initial activities. The law established a 12-member commission: four of whom were to be appointed by the president; four by the Senate (equally split between both political parties); and four by the House (equally split between both political parties). The law provided for a chair and vice chair (they could not be members of the same political party); the appointment of new members in case of vacancy; and a date for the initial meeting (not more than 45 days after all appointments have been made). Members of the commission would receive no compensation. The commission had the power to spend money appropriated or donated to it; to accept donations; to hold hearings; and to enter into contracts. It was required to make annual reports to the president and Congress, and make a report about the memorial plans as soon as possible.

In 2008, Congress enhanced the commission's duties and powers. Section 332 of the Consolidated Natural Resources Act of 2008 (P.L. 110–229; May 8, 2008) more clearly defined the commission's ability to solicit donations and to contract for specialized services, and it permitted it to do so outside of existing federal law. The commission was also empowered to seek the assistance of any federal agency (so long as it paid for that assistance), to enter into cooperative agreements with the same, and to procure administrative and support services from the General Services Administration. A commission staff was also established. An executive director was required to be employed, and the commission was authorized to hire staff (including an architect, and no more than three senior staff) and to accept volunteers. Commissioners (and staff and volunteers) were now reimbursed for their reasonable travel expenses. Most importantly, an unlimited amount of money was authorized (but not actually appropriated) to carry out the commission's duties and to design and construct the memorial.

== Living vs. inanimate memorial ==
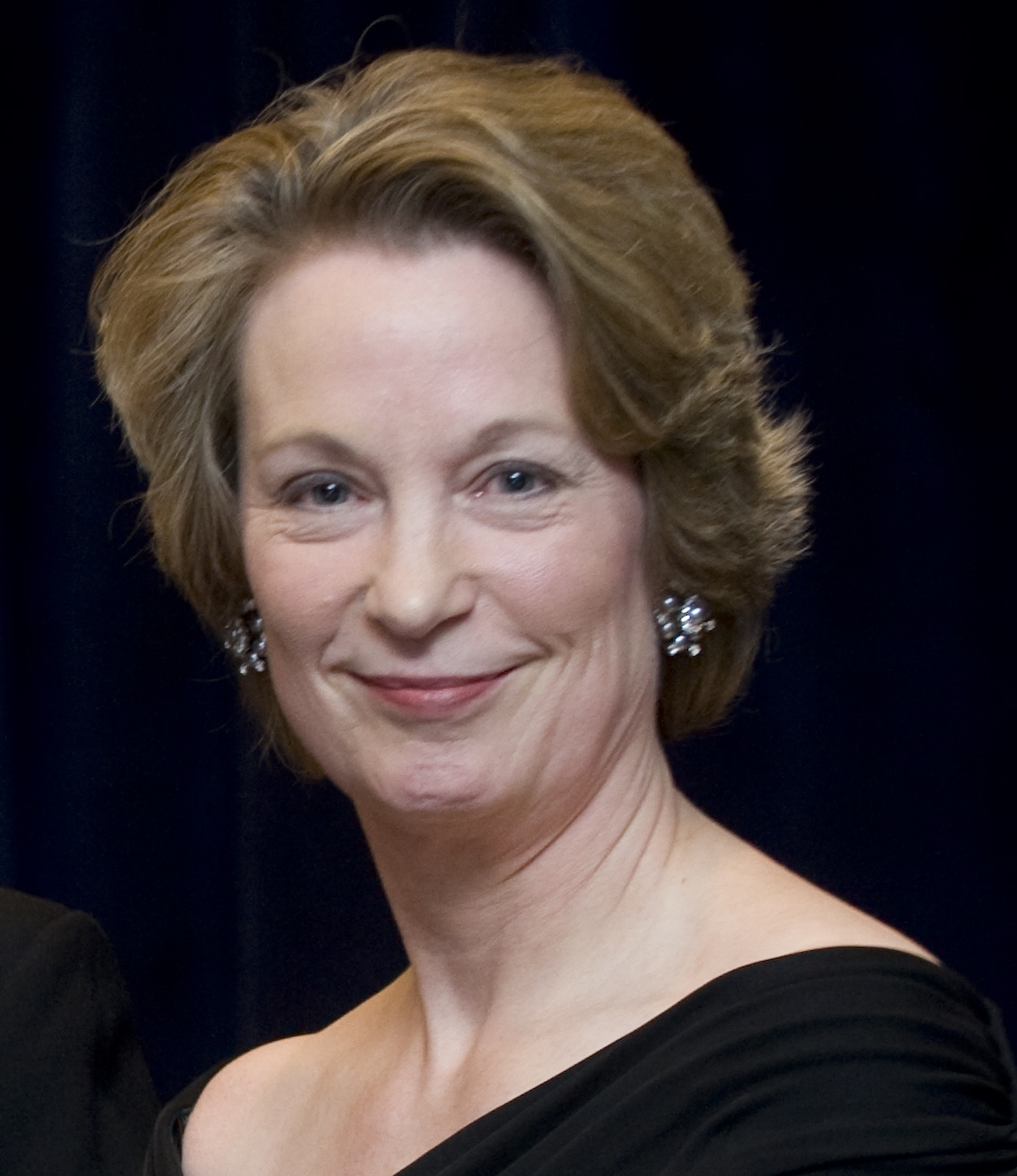
Susan Eisenhower advocated a "living memorial" rather than a monument.

The basic theme of the Eisenhower memorial was outlined at the Eisenhower Memorial Commission's first meeting in June 2000. Senator Stevens said he wanted an out-of-the-box design, and Senator Inouye said the design should be so spectacular that the Eisenhower Memorial would surpass the Lincoln Memorial and Jefferson Memorial as the most-visited memorial in the nation's capital. According to Washingtonian magazine, chairman Siciliano early on raised architect Frank Gehry as a potential designer. Siciliano was already friends with Gehry: they both lived in Santa Monica, California, and Siciliano's late wife had introduced them. Siciliano also sat on the board of directors of the Los Angeles Philharmonic, which in 1991 commissioned Gehry to design its acclaimed Walt Disney Concert Hall.

Several Eisenhower family members, however, expressed their desire for a "living memorial". Susan Eisenhower, granddaughter of Dwight Eisenhower and former president and chairman emeritus of the Eisenhower Institute, was a particular advocate of the concept. The living memorial would not be a monument but rather a program or think tank or some other organization which would help to perpetuate the legacy and values of President Eisenhower. The Woodrow Wilson International Center for Scholars was raised as a potential model. Siciliano expressed his view that a living memorial would be far too costly to endow and operate, but senators Stevens and Inouye thought the idea had merit. The Eisenhower Memorial Commission gave the Eisenhower Institute either a $200,000 contract or a $400,000 contract (sources differ as to the amount) to study the issue. (Note: Susan Eisenhower was then chairman of the Eisenhower Institute.) While the Eisenhower Institute studied the issue, the Commission agreed to also study a physical monument, which meant developing a vision for the memorial and identifying potential sites in Washington, D.C.

The outcome of the living memorial study is not clear. Washingtonian magazine reported that, at a commission meeting in June 2007, Siciliano said the Eisenhower Institute concluded a "living memorial" would duplicate the work of the institute and other "legacy organizations" (private foundations and nonprofits dedicated to perpetuating the legacy and carrying on the work of President Eisenhower). The Eisenhower Memorial Commission's March 2013 budget report to Congress, however, says that the legacy organizations were unable to agree on what form the living memorial would take. Whatever the reasons, the Commission rejected a living memorial. According to the memorial commission, Susan Eisenhower and representatives from other legacy organizations reached a consensus that the existing legacy groups already formed a "living memorial".

== Site selection ==
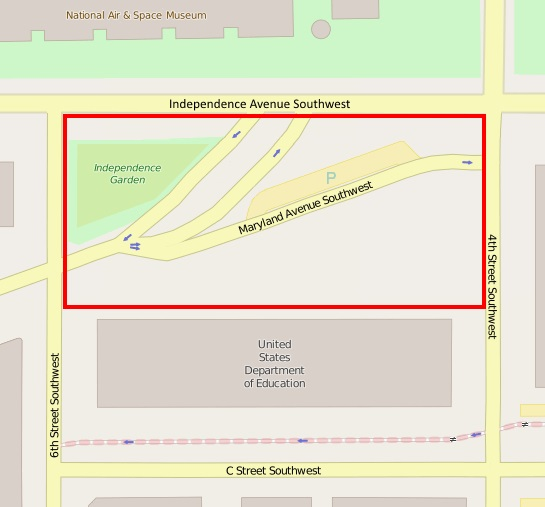
Site of the proposed Eisenhower Memorial (red boundary) in Washington, D.C.

In order to pursue a physical memorial, the Eisenhower Memorial Commission needed the authority to erect a memorial on public lands. Congress immediately gave it that permission in Section 8120 of the Department of Defense and Emergency Supplemental Appropriations for Recovery From and Response to Terrorist Attacks on the United States Act, 2002 (P.L. 107–117; December 20, 2001). The 2001 act gave the commission the right to erect a memorial on public lands under the jurisdiction of the Department of the Interior anywhere in the District of Columbia or its environs. The act also placed the memorial under the authority of the Commemorative Works Act. This required the commission to work with the National Capital Memorial Advisory Commission in selecting a site, meet certain fundraising requirements, and meet certain deadlines.

Twenty-six sites were reviewed by the Eisenhower Memorial Commission. The criteria for choosing a site included:

- "Prominence, public access, and availability";
- "Thematic appropriateness to Eisenhower's memory";
- "Feasibility of use and avoidance of undue controversy".

Three sites were short-listed by the commission. The first was on the ground floor of the United States Institute of Peace building at 2301 Constitution Avenue NW. The structure's vast atrium, which looks out on Constitution Avenue, was discussed as early as June 2004. But according to a commission report, a member of the Eisenhower family opposed co-locating the memorial there. The commission also considered Freedom Plaza on Pennsylvania Avenue NW and a site on Maryland Avenue SW. An Eisenhower family member requested in September 2004 that the commission also consider the Auditors Building at 14th Street SW and Independence Avenue SW. The commission hired M. Arthur Gensler Jr. & Associates, a design and architectural firm, to assist it in evaluating these three sites. A report was considered by the commission at its March 2005 meeting. Commissioner David Eisenhower successfully moved that the commission limit its focus to Freedom Plaza and the Maryland Avenue site. The Eisenhower Memorial Commission unanimously chose the unnamed plaza bounded by Maryland Avenue SW, 4th Street SW, and 6th Street SW as its preferred site.

The plaza is separated from Independence Avenue SW and the National Air and Space Museum by Seaton Section Park, and is adjacent to the north side of the Lyndon Baines Johnson Department of Education Building. The plaza is surrounded by institutions connected to Eisenhower's legacy, including the Department of Education, the Department of Health and Human Services, the Federal Aviation Administration, the Voice of America, and the National Air and Space Museum. The location is also just three blocks from the United States Capitol. The commission requested that the site be named "Eisenhower Square" once the memorial was built.

Selection of this site immediately caused controversy. Some urban planning advocates who wanted to restore Maryland Avenue SW to its original alignment through the square were angry because the memorial would preclude it. Nonetheless, on November 8, 2005, the National Capital Memorial Advisory Commission approved the Eisenhower Memorial Commission's request that the Eisenhower Memorial be located on Maryland Avenue.

The choice of the Maryland Avenue site involved additional congressional action. The Commemorative Works Act barred the erection of any memorials within "Area 1", the National Mall and its immediate environs. Any memorial erected in Area 1 required the approval of Congress. Congress provided that approval in "Approving the location of the commemorative work in the District of Columbia honoring former President Dwight D. Eisenhower" (P.L. 109–220; May 5, 2006), which authorized construction of the memorial within Area 1.

== Design competition ==
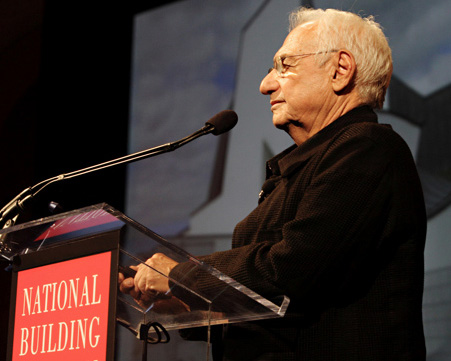
Frank Gehry in 2007, about the time he won the memorial design competition.

The design process began in 2006. At a commission meeting to consider design principles in March 2006, Siciliano mentioned Gehry for a second time as a possible designer. Susan Eisenhower, who was present as a member of the audience, asked if "the design vocabulary would be modern or traditional". A commission staff member said her question was "premature". Siciliano answered Eisenhower by saying the final memorial would be a "high-quality" one, and then mentioned again that Gehry was interested in designing the monument.

The commission moved ahead with pre-planning for the design competition in 2007. It hired the architectural firm Skidmore, Owings & Merrill to create a document which would outline "what the National Eisenhower Memorial should be, including goals, requirements, constraints, and opportunities." The following year, the commission issued a call for proposals via the General Services Administration's Design Excellence Program. (Note: This program is a process for identifying, interviewing, and hiring architects of excellence for federal buildings.) After initially denying a FOIA request filed by the National Civic Art Society, the General Services Administration revealed that it solicited and received design entries from fewer than 50 firms. None of the firms were minority-owned firms, six firms were owned by women, and 11 firms were small businesses.

After receiving more details from those on its selected short list, the Eisenhower Memorial Commission selected the proposal submitted by Frank Gehry of Gehry Partners on March 31, 2009. According to Washingtonian magazine, Gehry was Commissioner David Eisenhower's second choice. Nonetheless, David Eisenhower was reportedly very pleased with Gehry's selection. In March 2009, David Eisenhower said he could "vouch for the integrity and excellence of the selection process."

The design competition has been strongly criticized. An early critic of the competition was Justin Shubow, head of the National Civic Art Society. Shubow characterized the design process as rigged in Gehry's favor, and established a web site, EisenhowerMemorial.net, to attack the Gehry design. Edward A. Feiner, former chief architect of GSA and the creator of the Design Excellence Program. also objected to the memorial competition for being a closed competition. Critics also included Paul D. Spreiregen, architect, professional advisor for the Vietnam Veterans Memorial competition, and former chairman of the American Institute of Architects' Committee on Competitions, who in 2011 called for a design competition open to the public. On February 29, 2012, Representative Darrell Issa, chair of the House Oversight and Government Reform Committee, launched an investigation into the competition. Although Issa's primary concern was the memorial's design, Issa requested that Eisenhower Memorial Commission chair Rocco Siciliano provide the committee with copies of all proposed designs submitted during the competition, a detailed description of competition process and the means by which the commission selected the Gehry submission, and documentation on all votes taken by the commission regarding the competition. Issa, in his capacity as an ex officio member of the National Capital Planning Commission, also directed the Eisenhower Memorial Commission to preserve all documentation related to the competition and the Gehry design. Issa's investigation went no further than that in 2012. However, on March 20, 2012, the Subcommittee on National Parks, Forests and Public Lands of the House Natural Resources Committee held a hearing into the design competition. Subcommittee chairman Representative Rob Bishop (R-Utah) asked how much it would cost to run a second design competition, and Roll Call said Bishop "tried to restart the design competition". (Note: The Government Accountability Office said in July 2013 a new design competition would take five years and cost $17 million.) Although the subcommittee selected mostly witnesses who were critical of the Gehry design, a few defended the design competition process as fair. William J. Guerin, assistant commissioner for the Office of Construction at GSA, said critics mischaracterized the call for proposals as a closed competition. Ned Cramer, editor of Architect magazine, wrote nine days after the hearing that the design competition was a "limited request for qualifications" rather than a closed competition. Architectural critic Aaron Betsky decried the general tone of the hearing as "mindless innuendo and vituperative allegations", and Cramer agreed. Lydia DePillis of the Washington City Paper described the debate as a disorganized parade of criticism which was reaching "historic proportions".

== Design development ==
On March 25, 2010, the Eisenhower Memorial Commission unanimously selected the preferred design concept created by Frank O. Gehry and the commission and design team completed its first round of meetings with federal review agencies.

The setting for the 4-acre (1.6 ha) memorial on Maryland Avenue would be framed by giant welded steel tapestries supported by columns 80 feet (24 m) tall by 10 feet (3.0 m) wide. The largest tapestry would extend nearly the entire city-block length of the Department of Education Building, and would depict an aerial view of Normandy Beach at the present day. Elements of Eisenhower's home in Abilene, Kansas would be included, according to the commission.

Gehry's initial tapestry design, which depicted the Kansas landscape, received unanimous concept approval from United States Commission of Fine Arts (CFA) on September 15, 2011, including affirmation that the scale and artistry were appropriate. The Department of Education originally questioned the tapestries. However, following revisions and meetings including the review of tapestry mock-ups, Secretary of Education Arne Duncan wrote that the U.S. Department of Education supported the current design of the memorial. The National Capital Planning Commission (NCPC) also expressed support for the design but had not yet given preliminary approval. The Architect of the Capitol endorsed Gehry's design revision, and "applaud[ed] the decision, courage, and commitment of time" that the design team gave to the Section 106 Consultation Meeting process, noting that there were no negative impacts on the view and vista of the U.S. Capitol.

The commission's preferred design concept was approved in March 2010, which included the approval of Commissioner David Eisenhower, Dwight Eisenhower's grandson. It represents Eisenhower as president and general through large stone bas reliefs and text. Although final images and quotations were still under consideration, the leading alternative image representing the general was General Eisenhower with 101st Airborne troops prior to the D-Day invasion in June 1944.

Memorials in Washington have historically been controversial. The design was severely criticized by the president's son John Eisenhower and granddaughter Susan Eisenhower, who said her entire family opposed it. Robert Campbell, the Boston Globe's architecture critic, said about the design, "It's way too big. It's too cartoony. Someone should scrub the design and start over." Roger L. Lewis, an architect and a professor emeritus at the University of Maryland, criticized and opposed the design in The Washington Post: "Building a quasi-fenced precinct makes no sense. The narrative theme relating to Eisenhower's boyhood, so visually dominant in the present design, also makes no sense. Gehry instead could craft a less grandiose yet visually powerful memorial composition..." Columnist Richard Cohen wrote that the Memorial did not accurately capture Eisenhower's life. George F. Will also opposed the design in The Washington Post. The design has been criticized in The New Republic, National Review, Foreign Policy, Metropolis Magazine, The American Spectator, and The Washington Examiner.

Philip Kennicott, The Washington Post culture critic, praised the design: "Gehry has produced a design that inverts several of the sacred hierarchies of the classical memorial, emphasizing ideas of domesticity and interiority rather than masculine power and external display. He has 're-gendered' the vocabulary of memorialization, giving it new life and vitality." Former member of the U.S. Commission of Fine Arts Witold Rybczynski, whose critique of the memorial appeared in The New York Times, praised the concept of the roofless building and defended the size of the tapestries: "Mr. Gehry and his collaborators have developed hand-weaving techniques so that the screens really do resemble tapestries. Having seen full-size mock-ups of the screens on the site, I am convinced that their size will not be out of scale with the surroundings." David Childs, former chair of both the NCPC and U.S. Commission of Fine Arts, wrote to Congress in support of the design.

Landscape architects Laurie Olin and William Pedersen called the design a worthy tribute to a great national leader that was "in sympathy with the character of Washington, D.C." The Washington Post editorial board also endorsed the project, noting that "Mr. Gehry's proposal promises to be a wonderful addition to the face of the Mall, a vision Washington is lucky to have. Moving forward, Congress should authorize these plans as quickly as possible so the memorial can proceed on schedule. As entertaining as these squabbles have often been, enough is enough already." Television producer Norman Lear expressed praise for Frank Gehry, citing Gehry's original concept of tracing the journey of a young man from Kansas to the pinnacles of success as a warrior and the leader of a great nation as "the very best way to illustrate President Eisenhower's significant achievements..." Pulitzer Prize-winning architectural critic Paul Goldberger lauded Frank Gehry in a Vanity Fair article for earnestly attempting to commemorate Eisenhower.

=== Further developments ===
In December 2011, David Eisenhower resigned from the Eisenhower Memorial Commission. As the family's representative, Commissioner Eisenhower voted three times in favor of the preferred design concept, including most recently at the July 2011 Commission meeting.

In January 2012, the National Civic Art Society published The Gehry 'Towers' Over Eisenhower: The National Civic Art Society Report on the Eisenhower Memorial, written by Justin Shubow, the organization's president. Quoted in a front-page The New York Times story, the report is a book-length critique of the memorial's competition, design, and agency approval. The Washington Post said the report received "a remarkable amount of attention, offering talking points for conservative columnists and critics." Writing in Better! Cities & Towns, Philip Langdon called the report "scathing" and said it included "devastating pieces of information."

In May 2012, in response to public and congressional criticism Gehry proposed additional modifications to the memorial and the Eisenhower Commission published new mock-ups by his firm on its website.

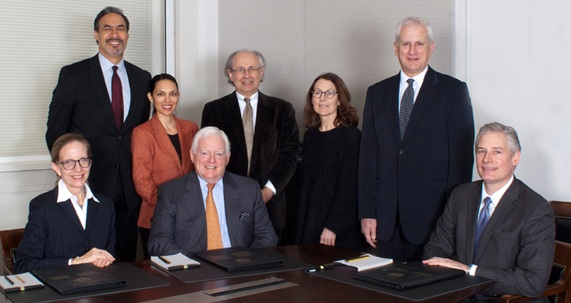
Members of the Commission of Fine Arts in 2013, who initially approved the memorial's concept, then later issued strong critiques of the design.

On July 18, 2013, the U.S. Commission of Fine Arts approved the general concept of the memorial in a 3–1 vote.

In August 2013, President Barack Obama appointed Bruce Cole to the Eisenhower Memorial Commission. Cole had previously criticized Gehry's design in articles and congressional testimony. Cole served on the board of advisors for the National Civic Art Society.

On September 8, 2013, the Eisenhower Memorial Commission cancelled its appearance before the NCPC meeting scheduled for September 12. The Eisenhower Commission explained, "We have decided to forego appearing before NCPC on Sept. 12 in the belief that the next few months would be better spent satisfying the concerns addressed in the [NCPC's Executive Director's Recommendation]." According to The Washington Post, the NCPC recommendation "calls the testing of the memorial materials insufficient, takes issue with the scale and placement of the columns and tapestries, and raises questions about whether the design fulfills its aim to be an 'urban park.'"

The Continuing Resolution approved by Congress on October 16, 2013, zeroed all construction funding and prohibited starting construction. It also required that all funding necessary to complete construction be in place before construction began.

On November 21, 2013, the memorial again went before the Commission of Fine Arts, where commissioners critiqued the design, which did not receive approval. Commissioner Alex Krieger, Professor in Practice of Urban Design at Harvard Graduate School of Design, said the design would fail as a "traditional first-semester architecture exercise." Also in November, a "weary" Gehry told the Financial Times, "I don't know whether [the memorial] will get built." The New York Times reported that "The project's fate is uncertain."

Congress's fiscal year 2014 omnibus bill appropriated only $1 million to the project instead of the requested $51 million, which halved the Eisenhower Commission's annual operating budget. The bill effectively blocked construction until the next round of appropriations. According to Roll Call the bill "zeroes out federal funding for construction and asks for a progress report on private fundraising efforts."

On April 3, 2014, the National Capital Planning Commission voted 7-to-3 to deny preliminary approval of the memorial. The NCPC said it was supportive of a memorial, but rejected the current design because it failed to preserve the vista along Maryland Avenue SW, failed to preserve the view of the U.S. Capitol building, did not meet the L'Enfant Plan's requirements for preserving open space, and did not "[respect] the building lines of the surrounding rights-of-way". At the request of Representative Darrell Issa, chair of the House Oversight and Government Reform Committee, the NCPC asked the Eisenhower Memorial Commission to report back to it every two months on its memorial redesign.

=== Design approval ===
In early September 2014, Gehry submitted another revised design to the commission. This design eliminated the east and west tapestries, moved the columns back from Independence Avenue, and made other, smaller changes to the memorial. The following week, Issa sent a letter to the commission, asking it to consider a memorial design that eliminated the tapestries and columns. Gehry threatened to remove his name from the project if the stripped-down version of the design Issa requested was approved and sent to the NCPC. The Eisenhower Memorial Commission met on September 17, 2014, to consider Gehry's design changes. But the commission lacked a quorum to conduct business, as only five members attended (all four presidentially-appointed members, and Rep. Sanford Bishop). In a private vote conducted via email on September 23, the commission approved Gehry's revised design. A motion to delay consideration of the design for several weeks was defeated. The commission forwarded only one design (Gehry's preferred revision) to the NCPC for its consideration, rather than the two alternatives requested by Issa.

On October 2, 2014, the NCPC voted 10–1 in to approve Gehry's revised preliminary design. The NCPC-approved design now headed back to the CFA. On October 16, the CFA approved the revised preliminary design. This approval allowed the memorial's designers to begin working on the specifics of the memorial, such as the statuary, the specific quotations to be used, the fonts for these quotations, landscaping, paving, and more. CFA and NCPC approval were needed for all design-specific elements.

=== Detailed design approvals ===
Eisenhower Memorial architect Craig Webb met with the Commission of Fine Arts on February 19, 2015, to seek approval of the memorial's lighting design, but the CFA declined to approve his proposal and asked him to return with a more concrete plan (one which included details on the actual ground lights to be used, and the location and height of lighting poles). Webb delivered a presentation on the quotations to be used on the memorial, but CFA members questioned whether the plan to use extracted and combined quotations would create the impression of "authentic text" where none existed. Webb discussed landscaping and signage with the CFA in March 2015. The CFA was positive about the landscaping design, although it suggested some changes and ask for additional study. It was more critical of the signage, and asked for alterations. Webb discussed sculptural elements with the commission in April, and generally praised the improvements. A review of design concepts for the tapestries, columns, and overlook wall occurred in May 2015, and strongly approved of these. As is often the case, the CFA asked for full-scale mock-ups (both day and night) for these elements.

On May 8, 2015, the National Park Service issued a final draft of its Determination of Effect, a legally required assessment of the project's negative impact on nearby historic properties. The document affirmed that any impact would be minimal. Prominent local architect Arthur Cotton Moore challenged this finding in a May 22 letter to the District of Columbia's State Historic Preservation Officer, arguing that the memorial would significantly alter the L'Enfant Plan. NPS Facility Division Chief Sean Kennealy replied to issues raised by Moore and others on June 4, concluding that Maryland Avenue SW would be enhanced by the elimination of parking lots and the memorial's alignment of tree plantings.

The Commission of Fine Arts gave its unanimous final approval to the memorial's detailed plans on June 17, 2015. The approval meant that the memorial now needed the authorization of the NCPC, which scheduled a vote on for its final approval for July 9.

On July 9, 2015, the NCPC voted 9–1 to approve the final design submissions for the Eisenhower Memorial. (At least one industry publication noted that the project was now a joint venture between Gehry Partners and AECOM, which provides technical and management support services.) Although the NCPC was worried about the durability of the tapestry material and welds, the memorial commission's submission assuaged these concerns.

=== Additional design changes ===
With the Eisenhower family still unhappy with the memorial design, Congressional funding for the memorial appeared uncertain. James Baker, former U.S. Secretary of State and a member of the Eisenhower Memorial Commission advisory commission, met with members of the family and the design team and brokered a compromise. On September 14, 2016, Susan Eisenhower issued a letter in which she said Gehry Partners had agreed to include images of the D-Day landing sites (as they exist today) on the metal tapestry. A new quote ("The proudest thing I can claim is that I am from Abilene") would be added to the quotes carved into the blocks of stone. With these changes, the Eisenhower family agreed to support the memorial.

Additional design changes were made in early December 2016. The metal tapestry was changed to remove all images of Abilene, and now only featured the present-day Normandy coast at Pointe du Hoc. The statue of Eisenhower as a boy was relocated from its central location to a promenade located between the metal tapestry and the Department of Education building, and some text from Eisenhower's June 22, 1945, "Homecoming Speech" will be etched on a nearby wall. The architects felt this would better emphasize Eisenhower's attempts to create a Department of Education and in expanding the federal role in funding primary, secondary, and higher education. Four trees near the center of the memorial were also removed to improve views of the tapestry. The revisions needed to be approved by the NCPC and CFA.

At its meeting on January 23, 2017, the CFA approved of the tapestry change, but did not support moving the boyhood statue behind the tapestry nor the removal of the four trees. The agency asked for the architects to revisit and resubmit the design for final approval, and asked that a full-size, on-site mock-up of the Normandy tapestry be provided for commissioners' viewing to ensure the tapestry's legibility. In October 2017, the NCPC approved design changes to the tapestry showing the site of the Normandy landings centered on Pointe du Hoc, and placement of the boyhood statute, with related text.

== E-memorial ==
In August 2012, the Eisenhower Memorial Commission announced plans for an "e-memorial" to accompany the physical one. Eisenhower Memorial Commission officials claimed the Eisenhower Memorial would be the first presidential memorial to be augmented with an e-memorial.

The e-memorial will be a free mobile app designed by Local Projects, a media design firm which has worked with museums and historic sites to develop similar projects. Seven key episodes in Eisenhower's life—including his entry at United States Military Academy in 1911, D-Day in 1944, Eisenhower's election to the presidency in 1952, the racial desegregation crisis of 1957, and the creation of NASA in 1958—will be augmented with still images, video, and audio to both provide greater insight into how these events were not only important to Eisenhower but also helped change national and world affairs. Some visual components will be superimposed onto the physical memorial, to provide interactivity between the physical and virtual worlds. Some of the materials used by the app will be provided by the Dwight D. Eisenhower Presidential Library and Museum. Development costs for the app were anticipated to be $2 million, and the National Park Service would be responsible for maintaining and upgrading the e-memorial once the Eisenhower Memorial was dedicated.

On June 6, 2013, The Eisenhower Memorial Commission premiered the first of six videos which it said would be part of the e-memorial. The new video focused on D-Day. The film, which put the viewer in the role of Eisenhower as he made critical decisions regarding the Normandy landings, used rarely-seen D-Day footage. The General Services Administration issued a "sources-sought notice" asking scholars and educators to submit their names and availability to help design elementary and secondary school lesson plans for use on the memorial's Web site. (Note: Federal agencies are usually required to hold competitions for federal contracts. But when an agency is unsure whether there are more than two sources expert enough to bid on the contract, it may issue a sources-sought notice to see if there are more experts or companies capable of bidding. If the answer is yes, then a competitive bidding process will be held. If the answer is no, then the agency is permitted to issue a single-source contract and forego the competitive bidding mechanism.)

== Funding ==
As with most previous presidential memorials, the activities of the Eisenhower Memorial Commission and the design and construction of the Dwight D. Eisenhower Memorial were initially intended to be fully funded by the federal government. (Note: Section 8162 of the Department of Defense Appropriations Act, 2000 (P.L. 106–79; October 25, 1999) established the Eisenhower Memorial Commission and appropriated $300,000 for its expenses. Section 8120 of the Department of Defense and Emergency Supplemental Appropriations for Recovery From and Response to Terrorist Attacks on the United States Act, 2002 (P.L. 107–117; December 20, 2001) appropriated $2.6 million for the commission's needs. Section 8098 of the Department of Defense, Emergency Supplemental Appropriations to Address Hurricanes in the Gulf of Mexico, and Pandemic Influenza Act, 2006 (P.L. 109-148; December 21, 2005) appropriated another $1.7 million for the commission. Title II of the Emergency Supplemental Appropriations Act for Defense, 2008 (P.L. 110-161; December 19, 2007) appropriated another $2 million for the commission's needs. Title III of the Omnibus Appropriations Act, 2009 (P.L. 111-8; March 10, 2009) appropriated another $2 million for the commission's needs. Title III of the Department of the Interior, Environment, and Related Agencies Appropriations Act, 2010 (P.L. 111-88; October 29, 2009) appropriated another $3 million for the commission's needs, and $16 million for construction costs. The construction funds were to remain available until expended. Department of Defense and Full-Year Continuing Appropriations Act, 2011 (P.L. 112-10; April 14, 2011) zeroed out commission salaries and expenses. Title III of the Consolidated Appropriations Act, 2012 (P.L. 112-74; December 17, 2011) restored $2 million for commission salaries and expenses. The legislation appropriated $30.99 million for design and construction costs, provided that "beginning in fiscal year 2012 and thereafter, any procurement for the construction of the permanent memorial to Dwight D. Eisenhower...may be issued which includes the full scope of the project". The legislation also declared that the funds provided by Congress thus far shall be deemed to be sufficient to meet the fundraising requirements of the Commemorative Works Act (as amended), so that a construction permit shall issue. Section 1413 of the Consolidated and Further Continuing Appropriations Act, 2013 (P.L. 113-6; March 21, 2013) lowered the fiscal 2013 appropriation for commission salaries and expenses to $1.05 million and construction funds to zero. It also set the date for expiration of the commission's authority to begin construction at September 30, 2020. Section 138(b) of the Continuing Appropriations Act, 2014 (P.L. 113-46; October 16, 2013) suspended the $30.99 million construction funding for the memorial until: (1) the enactment into law of an appropriation for any project or activity provided for in this joint resolution; (2) the enactment into law of the applicable appropriations Act for fiscal year 2014 without any provision for such project or activity; or (3) January 15, 2014. Title III of the Consolidated Appropriations Act, 2014 (P.L. 113-76; January 16, 2014) appropriated $1 million for commission salaries and expenses, to remain available until expended. It did not address the suspension of construction authority. Section 131(b) of the Continuing Appropriations Resolution, 2015 (P.L. 113-164; September 18, 2014) again suspended the $30.99 million construction funding for the memorial.) The commission assured the Eisenhower family that no private fundraising for the memorial would be needed. This was an important issue for the Eisenhowers, who have established or sit on the board of directors of six legacy organizations. The family was concerned that fundraising for the memorial would negatively affect their ability to fundraise for these legacy organizations. In 2008, however, House Appropriations Committee staff informed the commission that Congress was no longer likely to completely fund the design and construction of the memorial due to the economic downturn caused by the Great Recession, and that some private fundraising would be required.

The commission consulted with the fundraising consulting firm Odell, Simms & Lynch (OSL) in February 2011 to develop a fundraising strategy. Representatives of the Eisenhower family met with OSL in March 2012, during which time the Eisenhowers expressed their concern with the fundraising campaign. OSL, however, argued that the legacy organizations would benefit from the successful completion of the memorial. OSL crafted a fundraising plan for the commission, and outreach to 200 major donors (defined as those individuals of high net worth) began in 2013. The commission targeted "individuals with a direct link to President Eisenhower and his legacy; organizations and individuals with an interest in the E-Memorial educational component; and friends and admirers of Frank Gehry and his work" in key markets such as California, Georgia, Kansas, New York, Texas, and Washington, D.C. Working with retired Marine Corps General Paul X. Kelley and former Republican National Committee chairman Frank Fahrenkopf, both members of the Eisenhower Memorial Commission's advisory board, OSL also reached out to members of the Giving Back Fund, all of whom are capable of donating more than $10 million. As of March 2013, the Eisenhower Memorial Commission had already raised $1.7 million in donations and pledges. (Note: According to a report by House Appropriations Committee investigators, the memorial commission had received just $447,618 in contributions. $300,000 of these cash donations came from a single donor.) Once the memorial design was approved, the commission said it was ready to move forward on fundraising outreach to corporations, foundations, and international organizations and foreign governments.

Congress has appropriated some funds for the memorial's design and construction, however. Congress appropriated $16 million in the Department of the Interior, Environment, and Related Agencies Appropriations Act, 2010 (P.L. 111–88; October 29, 2009), and $30.99 million in the Consolidated Appropriations Act, 2012 (P.L. 112–74; December 17, 2011). The 2011 legislation was also important because it allowed the commission to meet a critical fundraising challenge. The Commemorative Works Act requires a memorial foundation to raise 75 percent of the construction costs before the Department of the Interior is permitted to issue a construction permit. Additionally, the CWA requires a memorial foundation to raise an additional amount, equal to 10 percent of the memorial's total construction costs, for deposit in a memorial maintenance trust fund (administered by the National Park Service). The 2011 legislation declared that the funds provided by Congress thus far shall be deemed to be sufficient to meet both fundraising requirements of the CWA.

By March 2013, the Eisenhower Memorial Commission had spent $8.721 million of the $46.99 million in existing design and construction funds. However, in October 2013 Congress suspended the commission's exception to the full funding requirement of the CWA until it had the necessary funds, essentially preventing the commission from building a memorial (even if approved by the Commission of Fine Arts or the NCPC).

The cost of constructing the memorial was estimated to be $65 million to $75 million in October 2014. The memorial commission said it had $22 million in appropriated funds to left to begin construction, which the commission said it would use for site preparation (estimated to cost $22 million). However, the CWA requires that the commission have at least 75 percent of construction funds in hand before work could begin. Although the legislation authorizing the memorial originally waived the CWA's requirements, the 2014 legislation barring the commission from expending its remaining funds also withdrew that waiver. The Eisenhower Memorial Commission said it would ask Congress to restore the waiver so that construction could begin immediately.

=== Additional funding ===
On December 16, 2014, President Barack Obama signed Public Law 113–235 (128 Stat. 2443), which set aside $1 million for salaries and expenses of commission members and the cost of construction design. But all other funding for the memorial was zeroed out, and Congress eliminated the 2011 CWA funding waiver. But despite the preliminary design approval, Anne and Susan Eisenhower spent the first several months of 2015 lobbying Congress for changes in the memorial.

The Eisenhower Memorial Commission asked Congress for a significant budget expenditure in fiscal 2016. In addition to a $2 million operating budget (for salaries and expenses), the commission requested $68.2 million to begin construction. However, the draft appropriations bill approved by the House Appropriations Committee in June 2015 contained no funding for the memorial, required the commission to limit its operations to "essential" daily functions only, and ordered the commission to comply with the CWA fundraising requirements before construction could begin. A nonbinding clause in the bill asked the commission to consider restarting the design process. "However, the Commission's ongoing indifference to the views of the Eisenhower family, and the resulting lack of consensus on the memorial design, remain an area of significant concern," the bill read. "It is inconceivable and unacceptable to the Committee that a memorial to Dwight D. Eisenhower could be designed, approved, and built without the active support of the Eisenhower family." The full House Appropriations Committee approved the draft on June 16. The draft Senate version of the bill funded commission operations at $1 million in fiscal 2016. The Senate bill contained nonbinding language, advising the memorial commission that "Construction should not commence until there is broad support among the public, the Eisenhower family and Congress."

By June 2015, the memorial's cost had risen to an estimated $142 million to $150 million. This was the cost still cited in December 2016. On July 13, 2015, the government of Taiwan announced a $1 million donation to the memorial.

The Eisenhower family announced their support for the memorial in September 2016. Fundraising had netted about $8 million as of December 1, 2016. In May 2017, a fiscal 2017 spending bill was enacted into law which gave the commission $45 million in construction funds. The commission announced it had received a total of $25 million to build the memorial. Major donations (in the $1 million to $5 million range) had been received from FedEx, Honeywell, Pfizer, and an anonymous donor. Commission officials said that if Congress authorized another $41 million in 2018, the commission would have enough money to build the memorial (a total of $111 million).

== Eisenhower Memorial Commission members ==
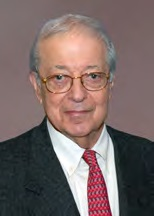
Rocco Siciliano was the first chairman of the Eisenhower Memorial Commission.

The Eisenhower Memorial Commission consisted of 12 appointed commissioners. Members in December 2020 are listed below.

Four members are appointed by the president of the United States:

- Bob Dole (Former Senator R-Kansas)
- Susan Banes Harris (Note: Ms. Harris is an original member of the commission. She was appointed a member on July 20, 2000. She was named Vice Chair after the death of Senator Inouye in 2012.)
- Alfred Geduldig (Note: Mr. Geduldig is an original member of the commission. He was appointed a member on July 20, 2000.)
- Catherine Ann Stevens

Four members are appointed by the president pro tempore of the United States Senate:

- Pat Roberts (R-Kansas) - Chairman (Note: Senator Roberts is an original member of the commission. He was appointed on January 24, 2000. Roberts was elected chairman of the commission on April 28, 2015.)
- Joe Manchin (D-West Virginia) (Note: Senator Daniel Inouye was an original member of the commission. He was appointed on February 23, 2000, and elected Vice Chair by the commission. He died on December 17, 2012, and Susan Banes Harris replaced him as Vice Chair. Senator Manchin was appointed his replacement on December 18, 2013.)
- Gary Peters (D-Michigan) (Note: Senator Ted Stevens was an original member of the commission. He was appointed on January 24, 2000. His term in the Senate ended on January 3, 2009. Senator Bob Bennett (R-Utah) was appointed as his replacement on March 12, 2009. Senator Bennett's term in office ended on January 3, 2011. Representative Jerry Moran was elected to the United States Senate in November 2010. Senator Moran was appointed to the commission on April 12, 2011. He resigned on September 17, 2014.)
- Dan Sullivan (R-Alaska)

Four members are appointed by the speaker of the United States House of Representatives:

- William (Mac) Thornberry (R-Texas) (Note: Representative Thornberry is an original member of the commission, and was appointed on March 21, 2000.)
- Mike Simpson (R-Idaho) (Note: Representative Jerry Moran was an original member of the commission, and was appointed on March 21, 2000. Moran resigned on January 3, 2011, due to his election to the U.S. Senate. Representative Simpson was appointed his replacement on April 15, 2011.)
- Sanford Bishop, Jr. (D-Georgia) (Note: Representative Dennis Moore (D-Kansas) was an original member of the commission. He was appointed on March 21, 2000. His term in Congress ended on January 3, 2011. Representative Bishop was appointed his replacement on October 14, 2011.)
- Mike Thompson (D-California) - Vice Chairman (Note: Representative Leonard Boswell (D-Iowa) was an original member of the commission. He was appointed on March 21, 2000. His term in Congress ended on January 3, 2013. Representative Thompson was appointed his replacement on July 31, 2013. Thompson was elected vice chairman of the commission on April 28, 2015.)

== Gallery ==
Images of the Dwight D. Eisenhower Memorial

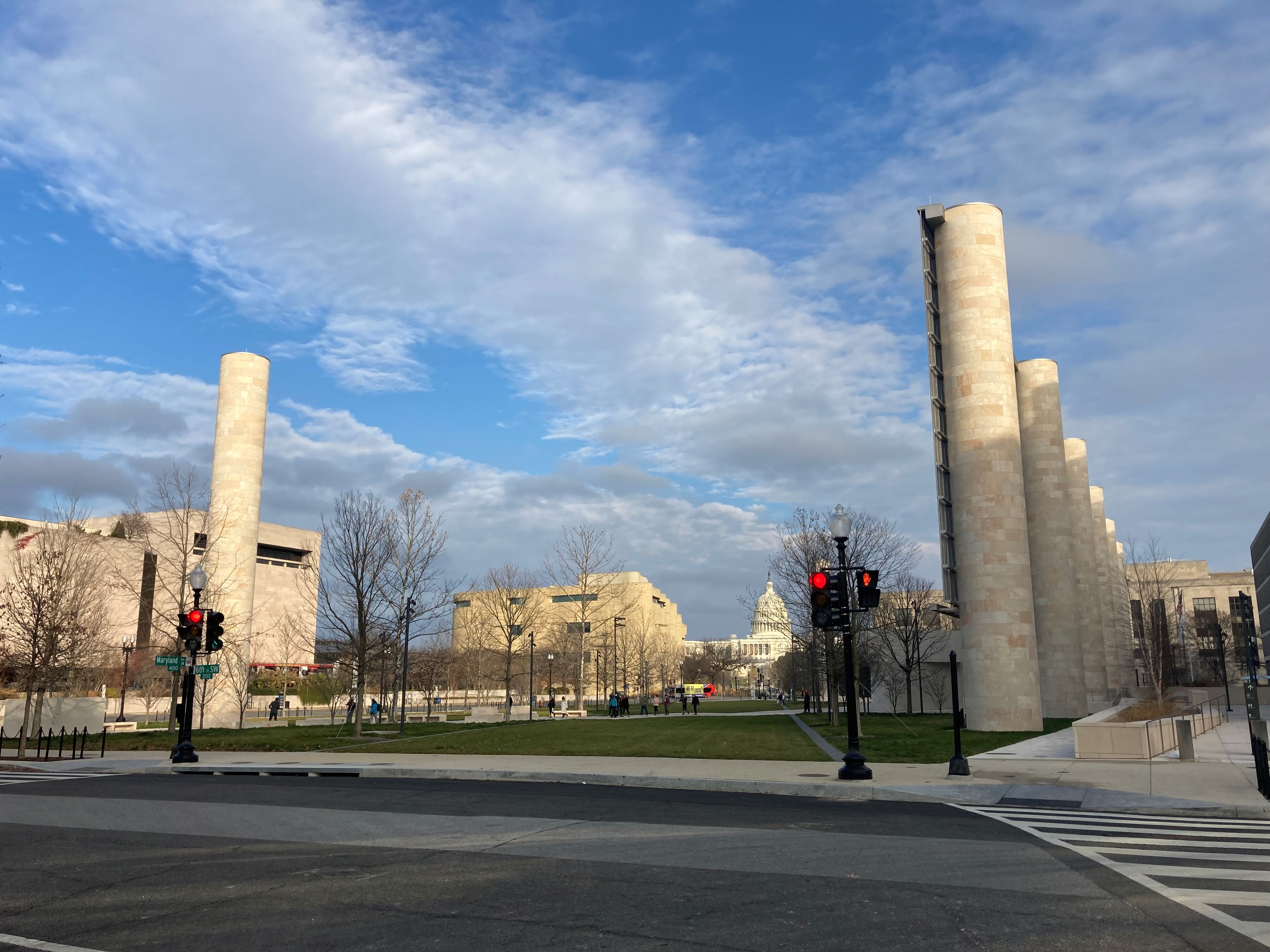
Eisenhower Memorial facing east, December 2020

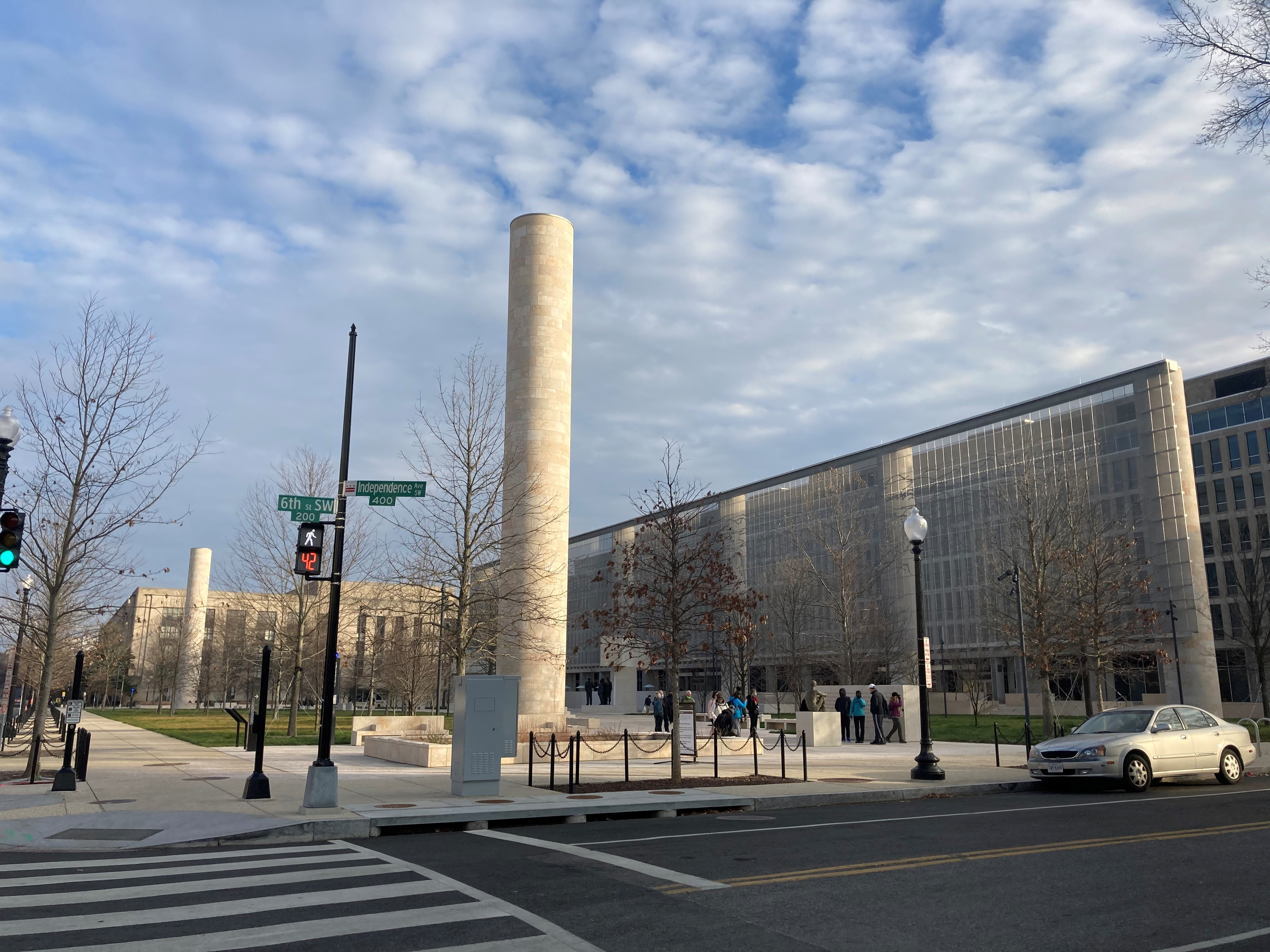
Eisenhower Memorial facing southeast, December 2020

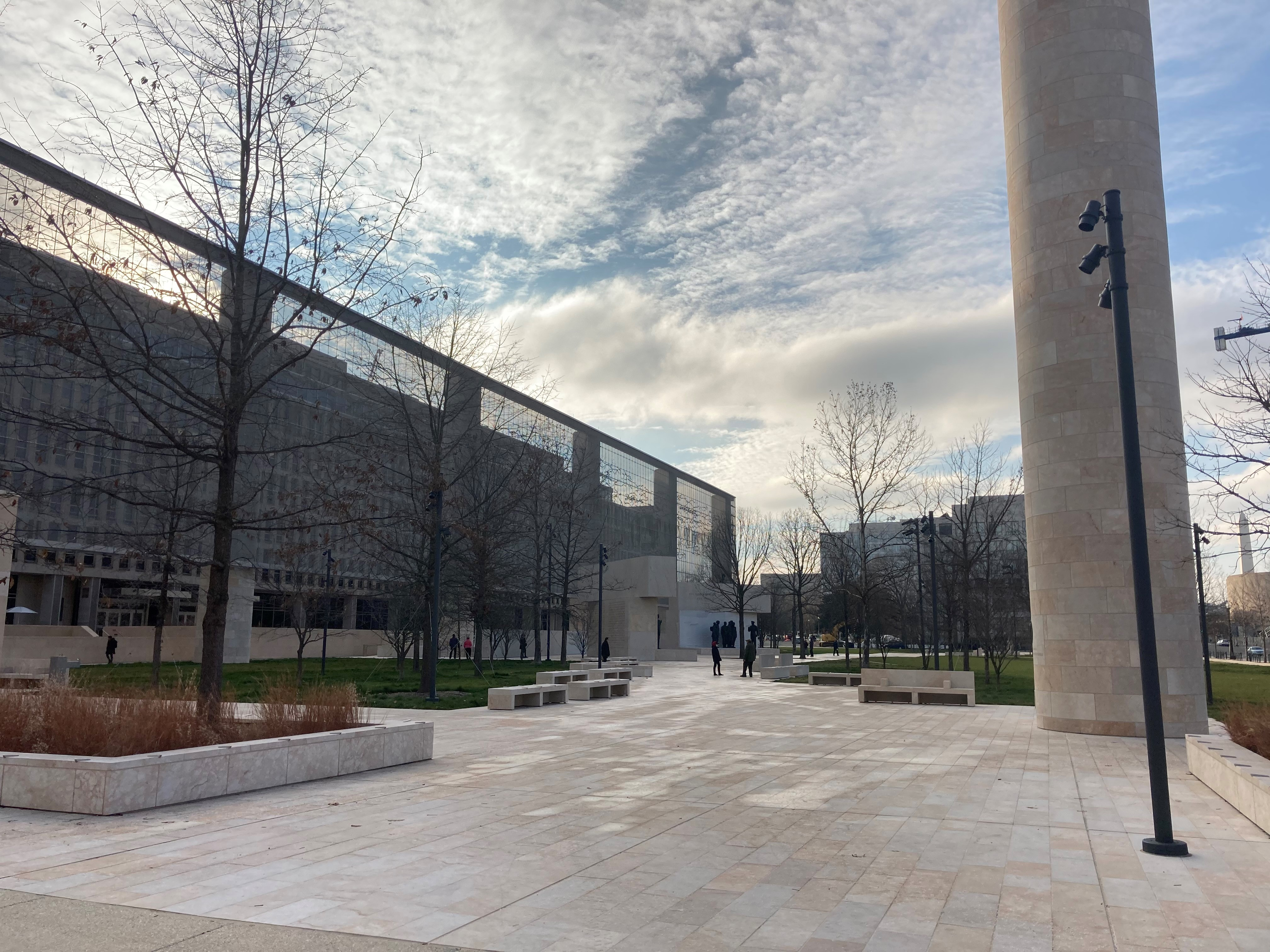
Eisenhower Memorial facing west, December 2020

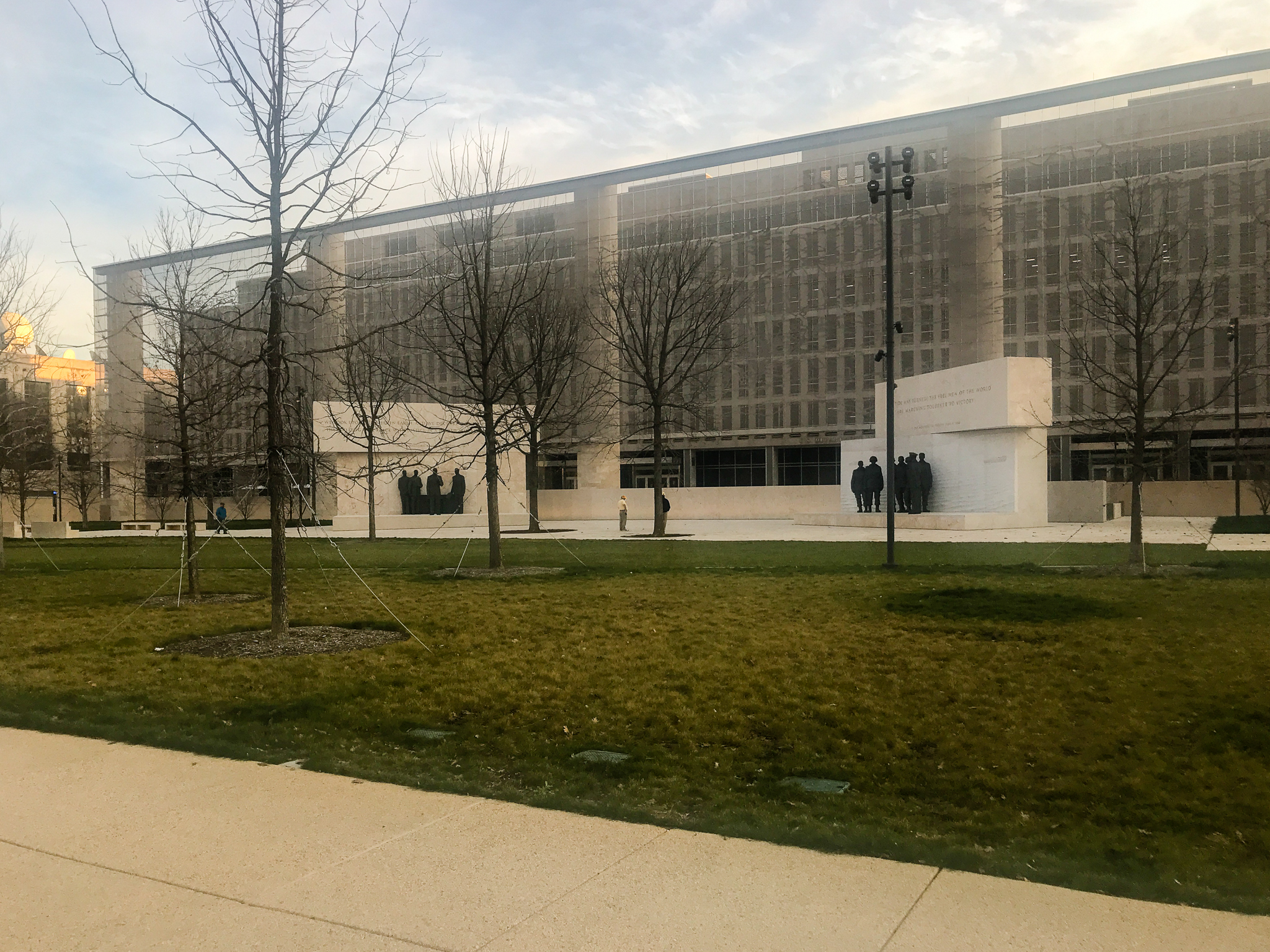
Eisenhower Memorial view from Independence Avenue

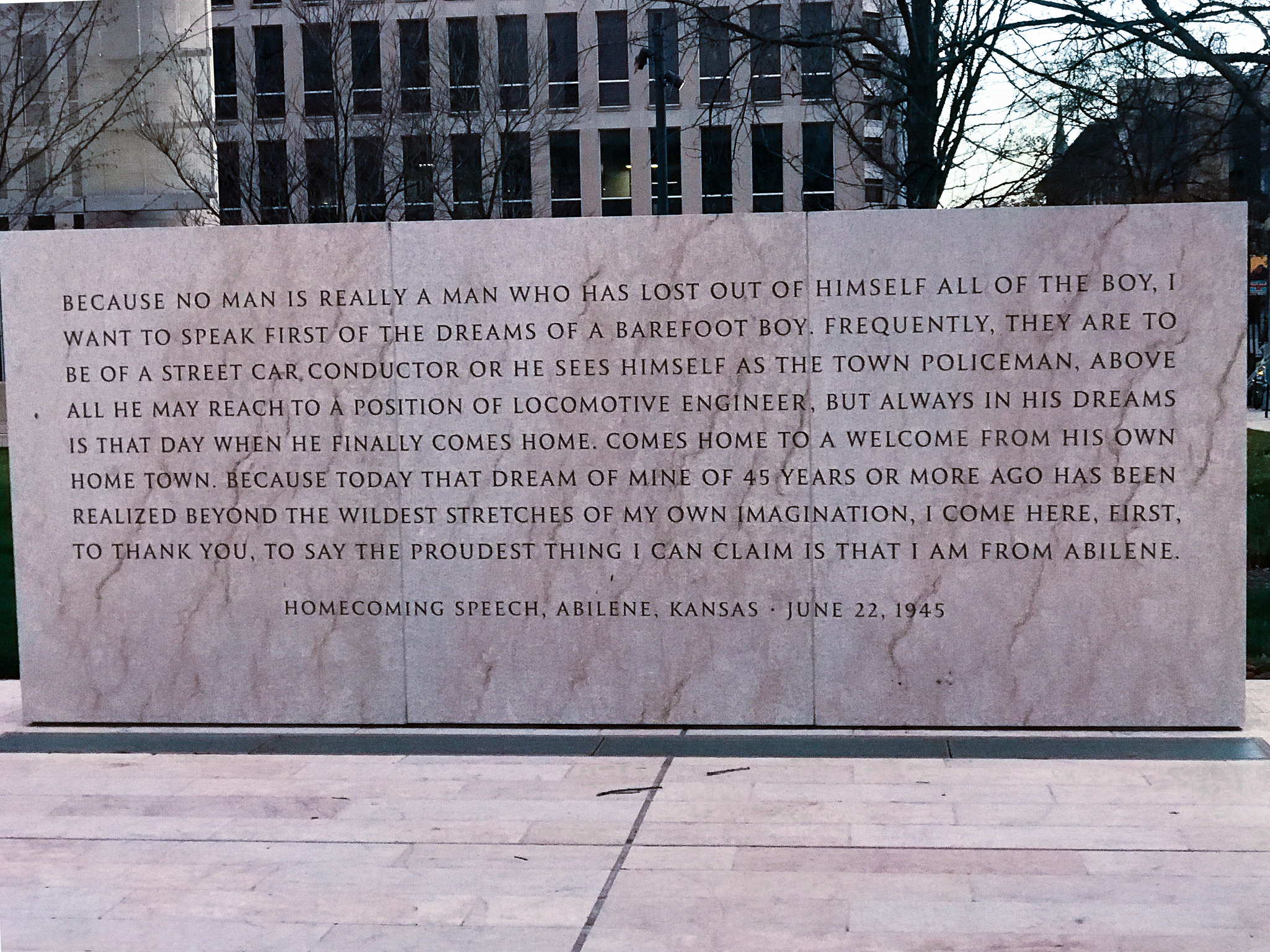
Plaque near statue of Ike as a boy

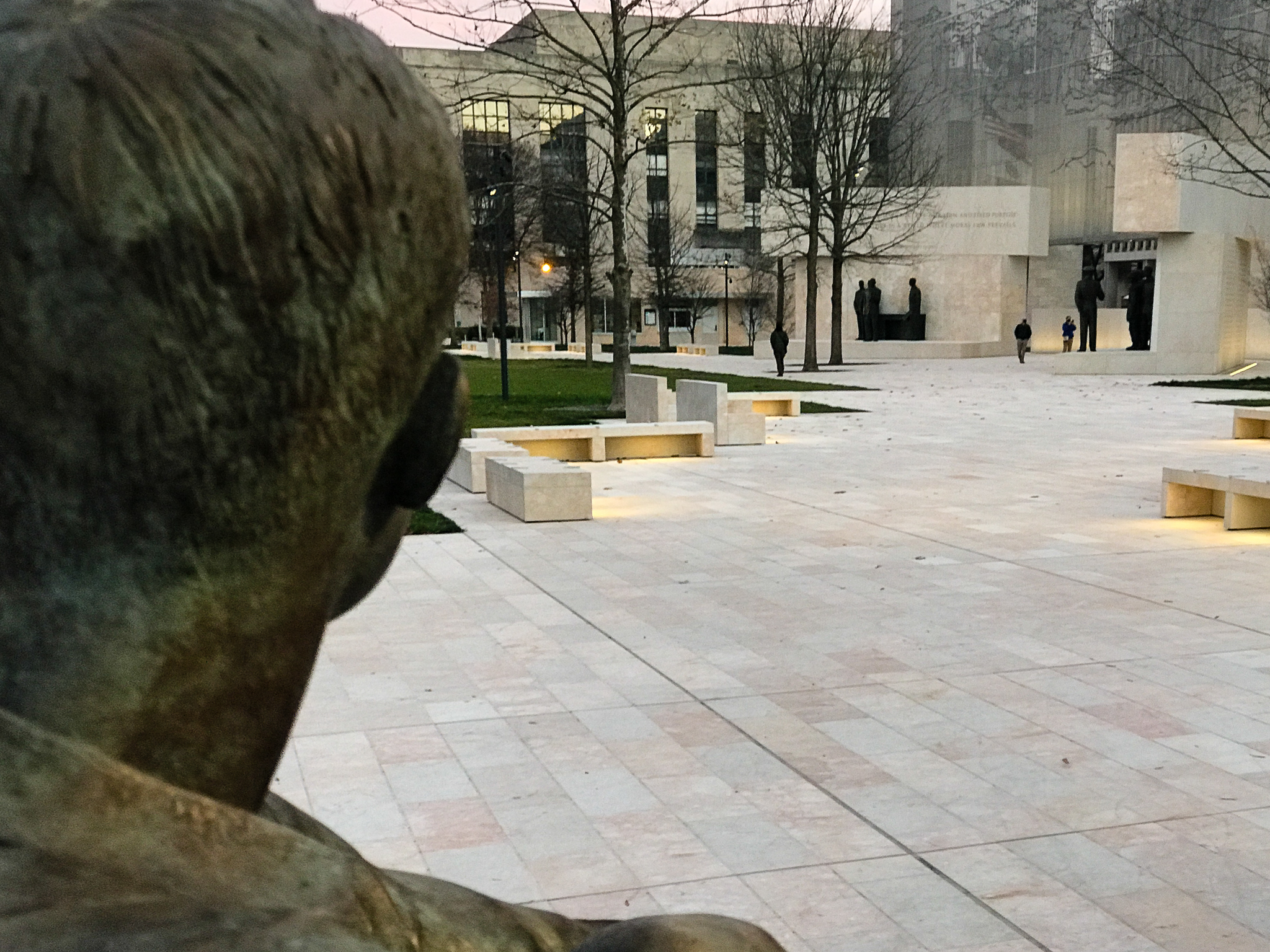
View of the Eisenhower Memorial looking over the shoulder of the boyhood statue

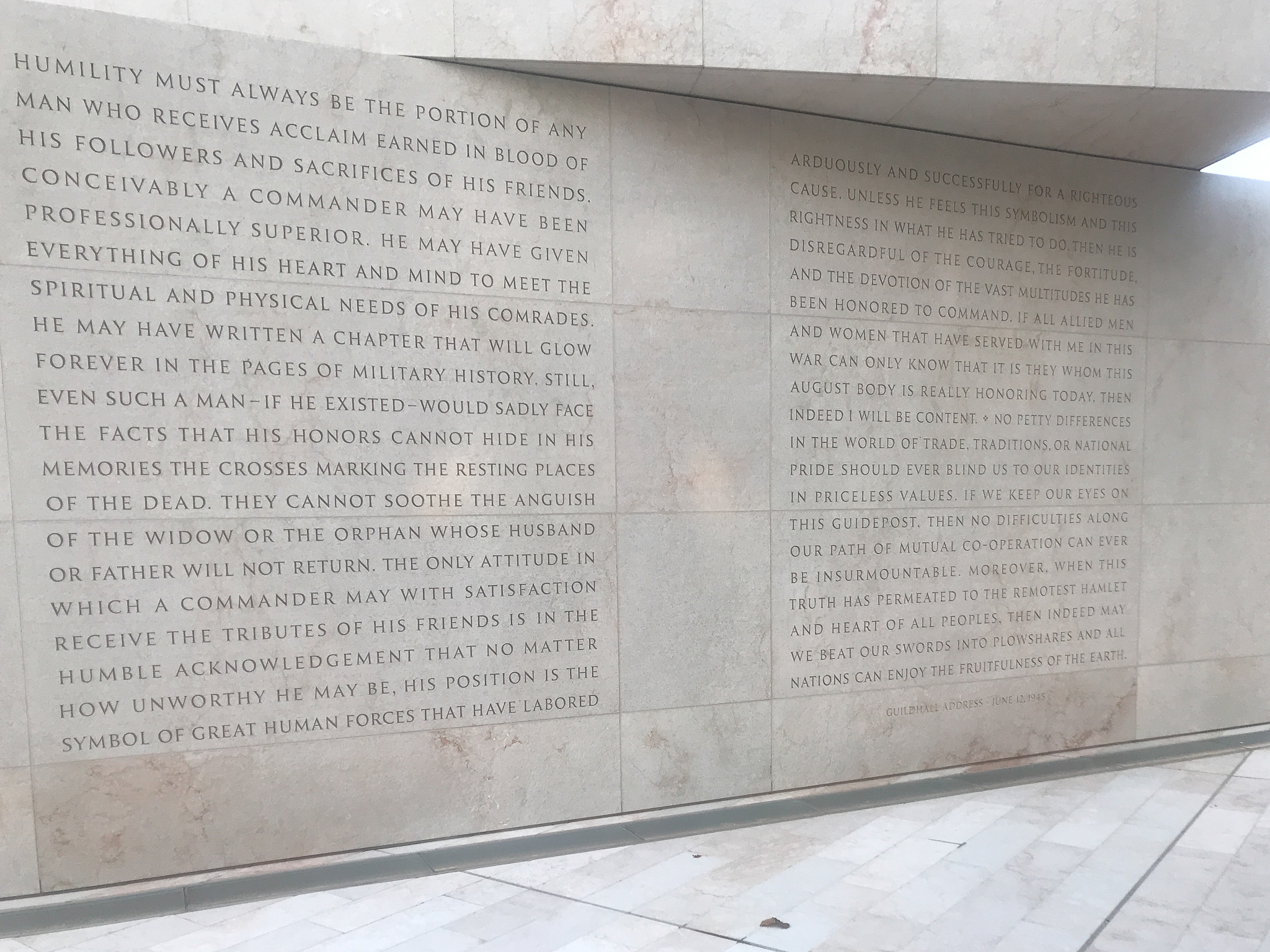
Rear view of sculpture that represents Eisenhower at war

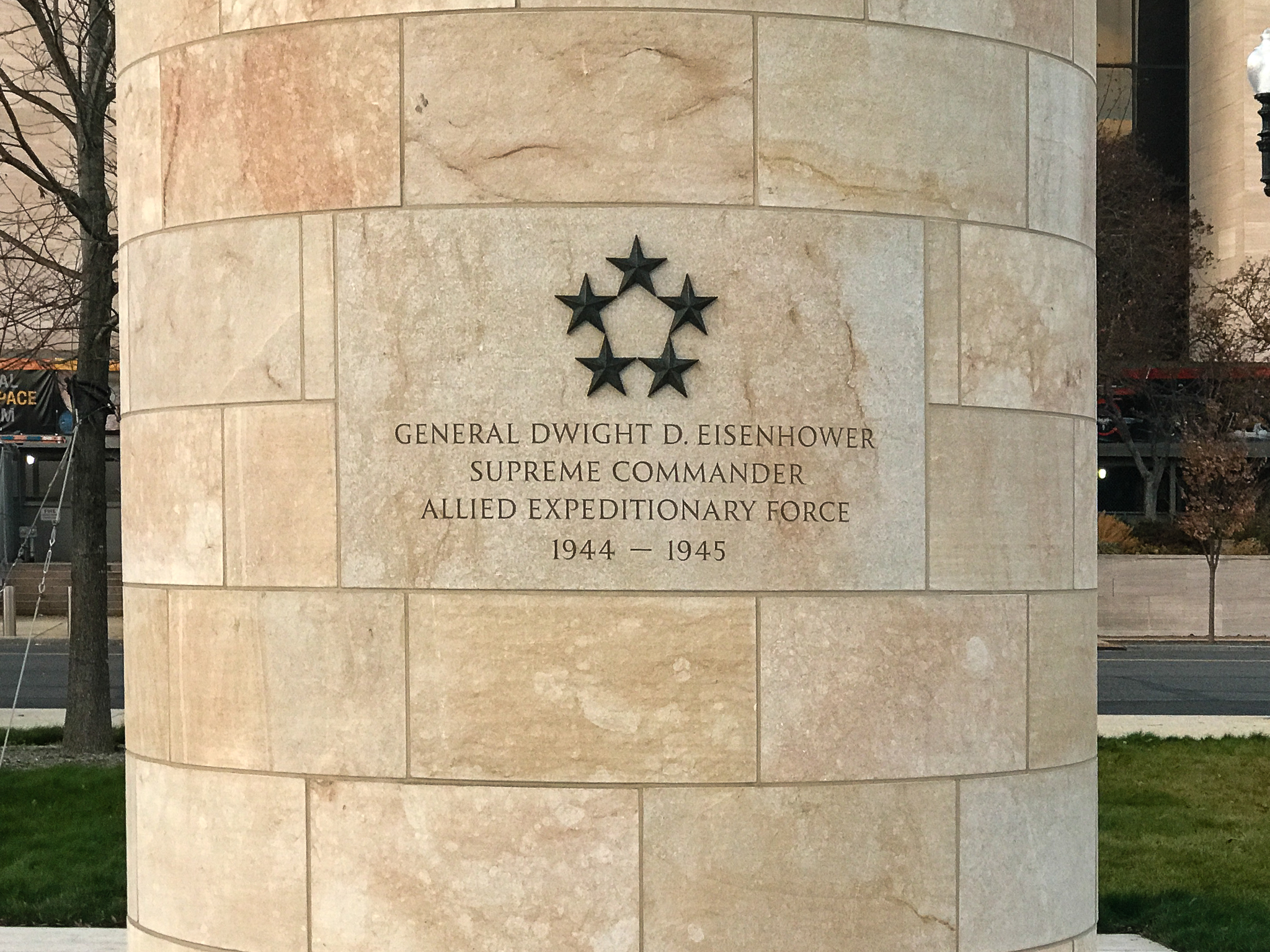
Plaque on column at northwest corner

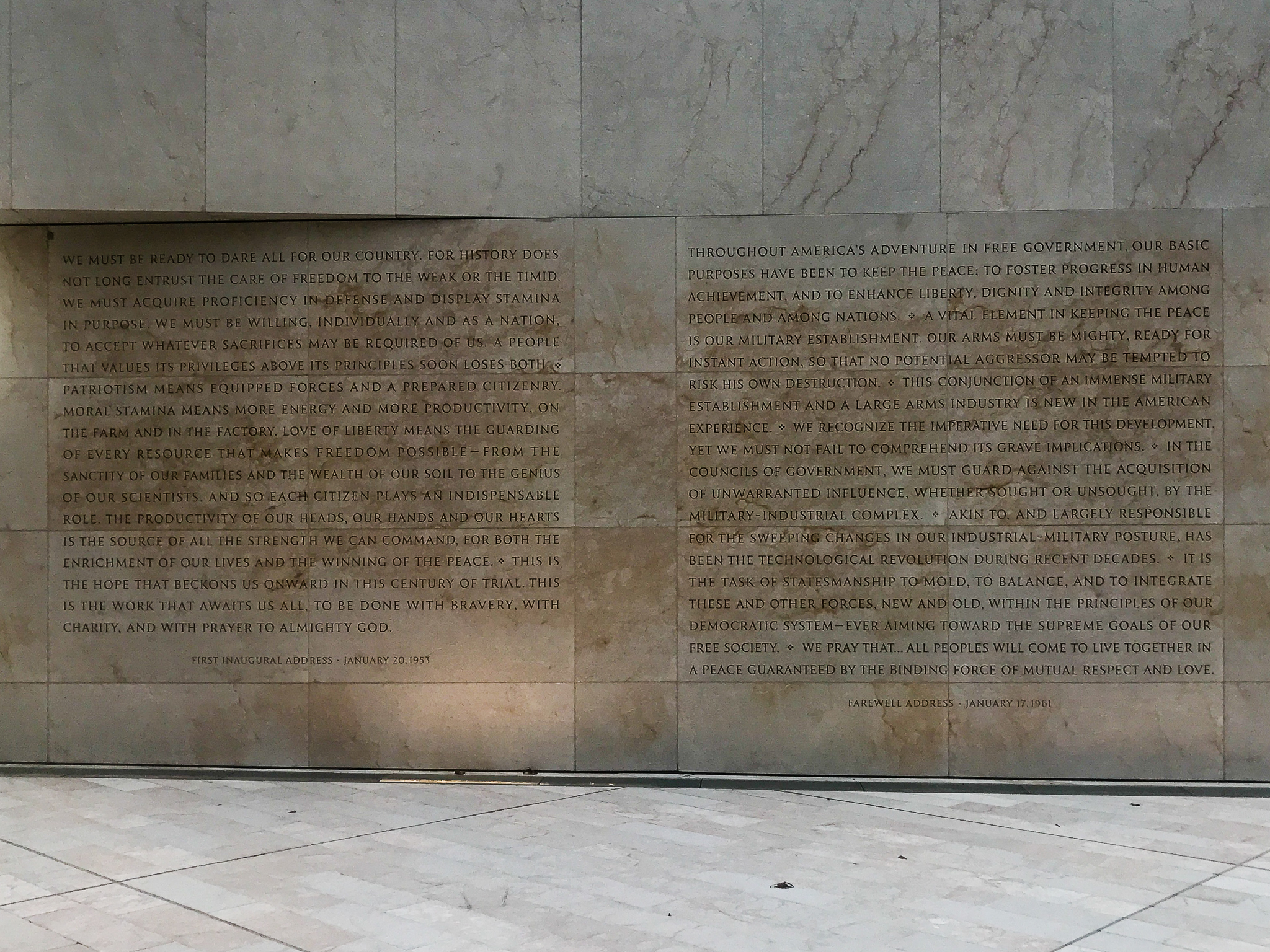
Rear view of sculpture that represents Eisenhower's presidency

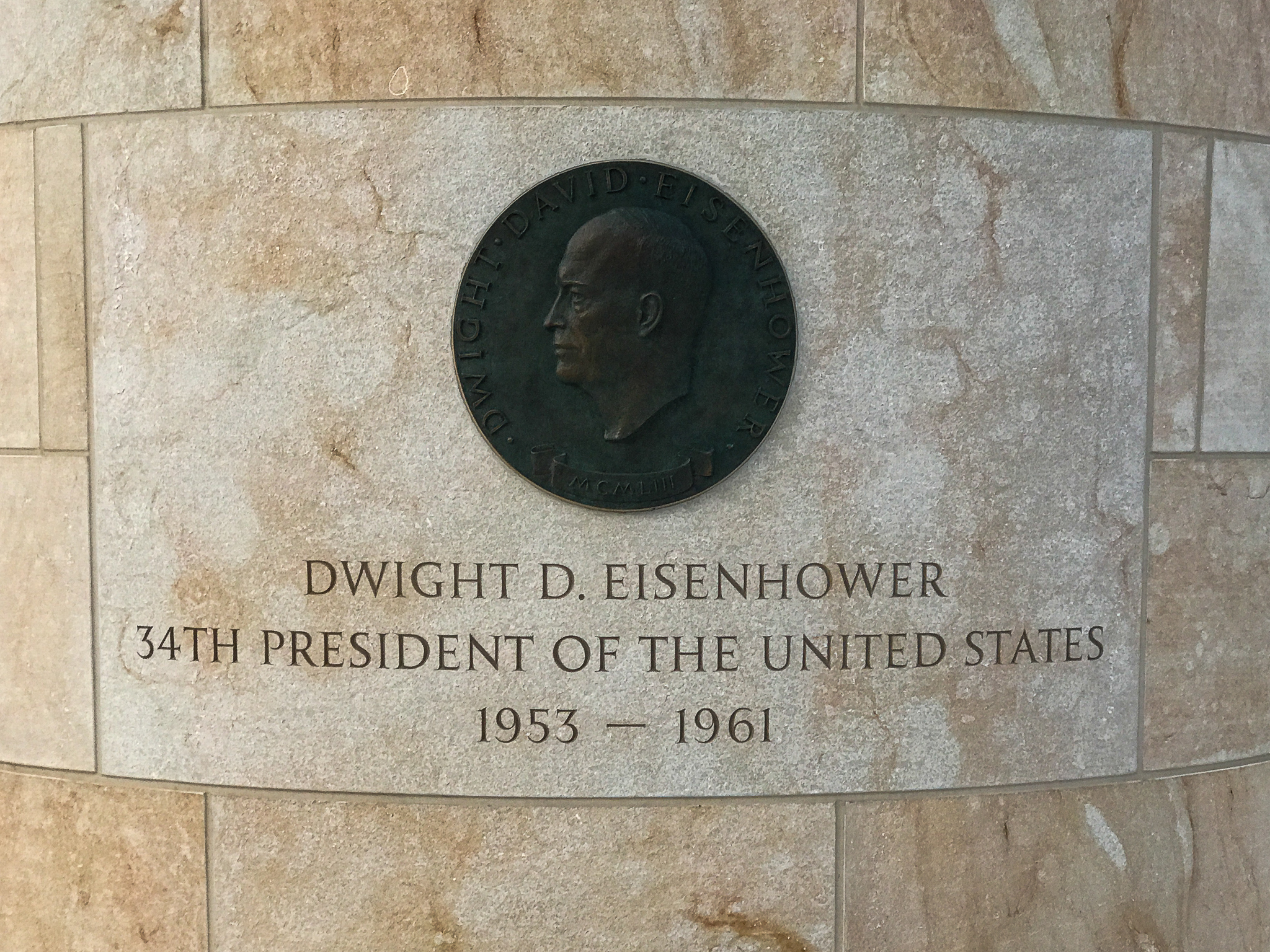
Plaque on column at northeast corner

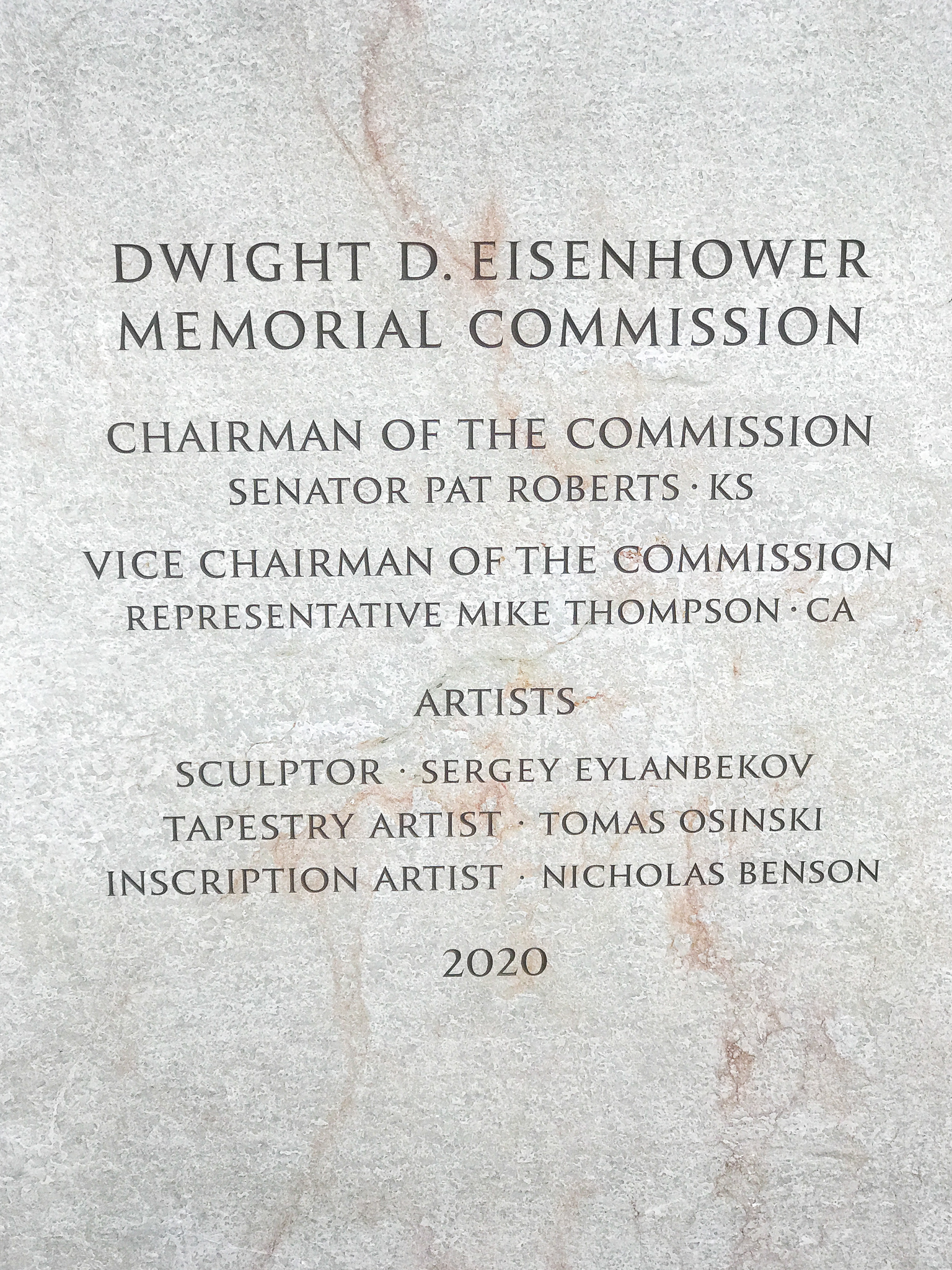
Information on side of sculpture that represents Eisenhower's presidency

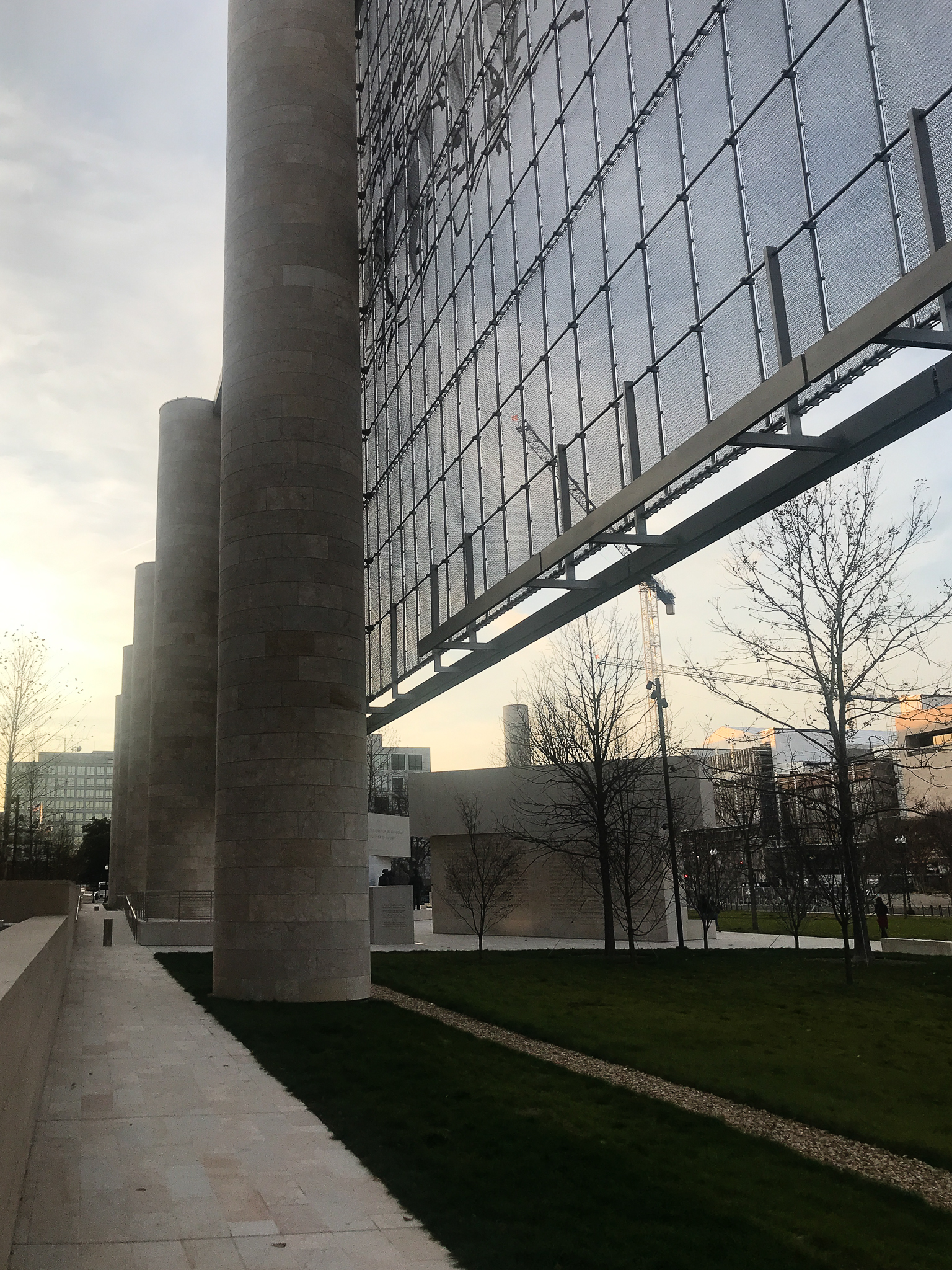
Rear view of tapestry

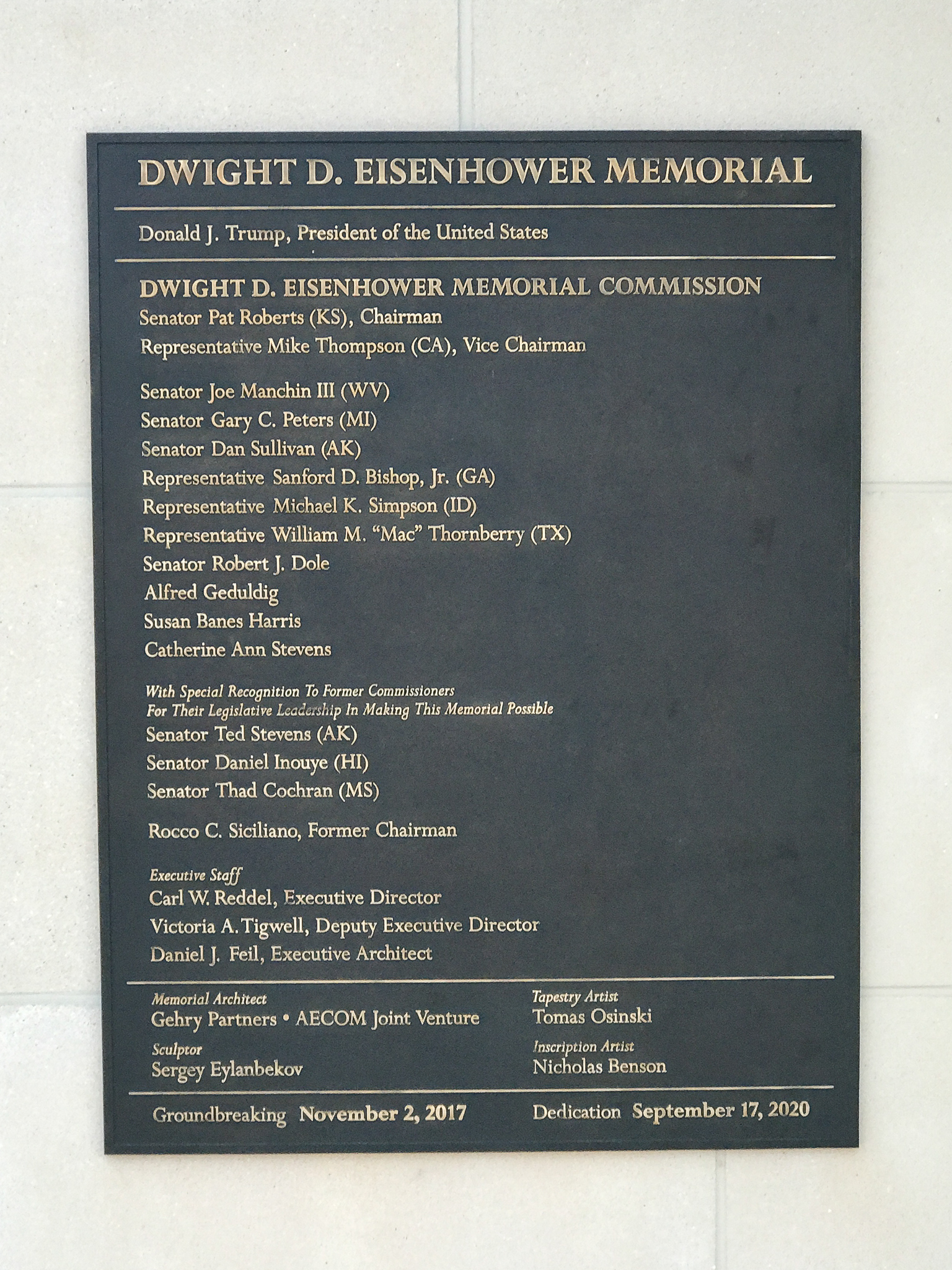
Plaque outside gift shop at Eisenhower Memorial

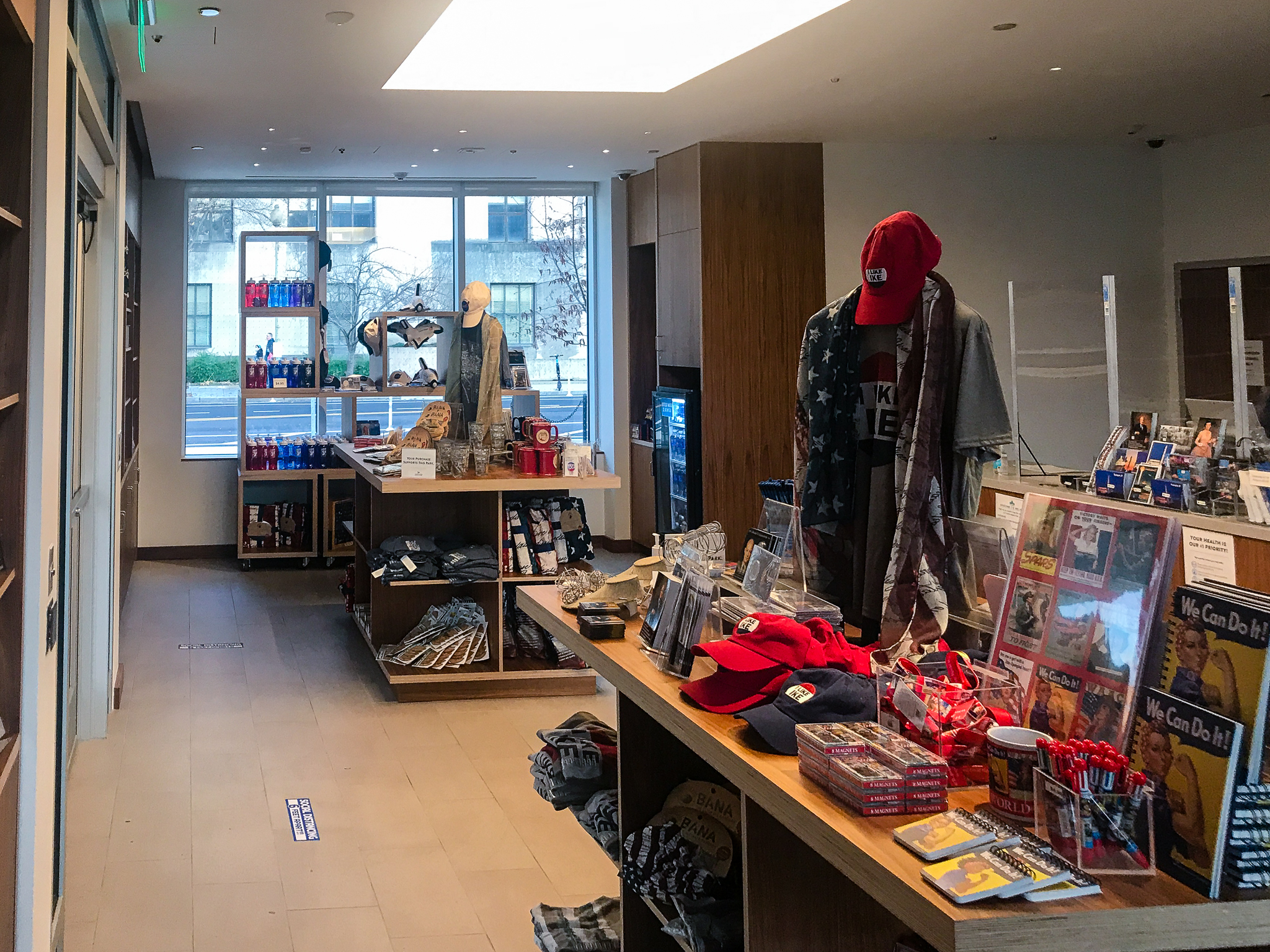
Gift shop at Eisenhower Memorial

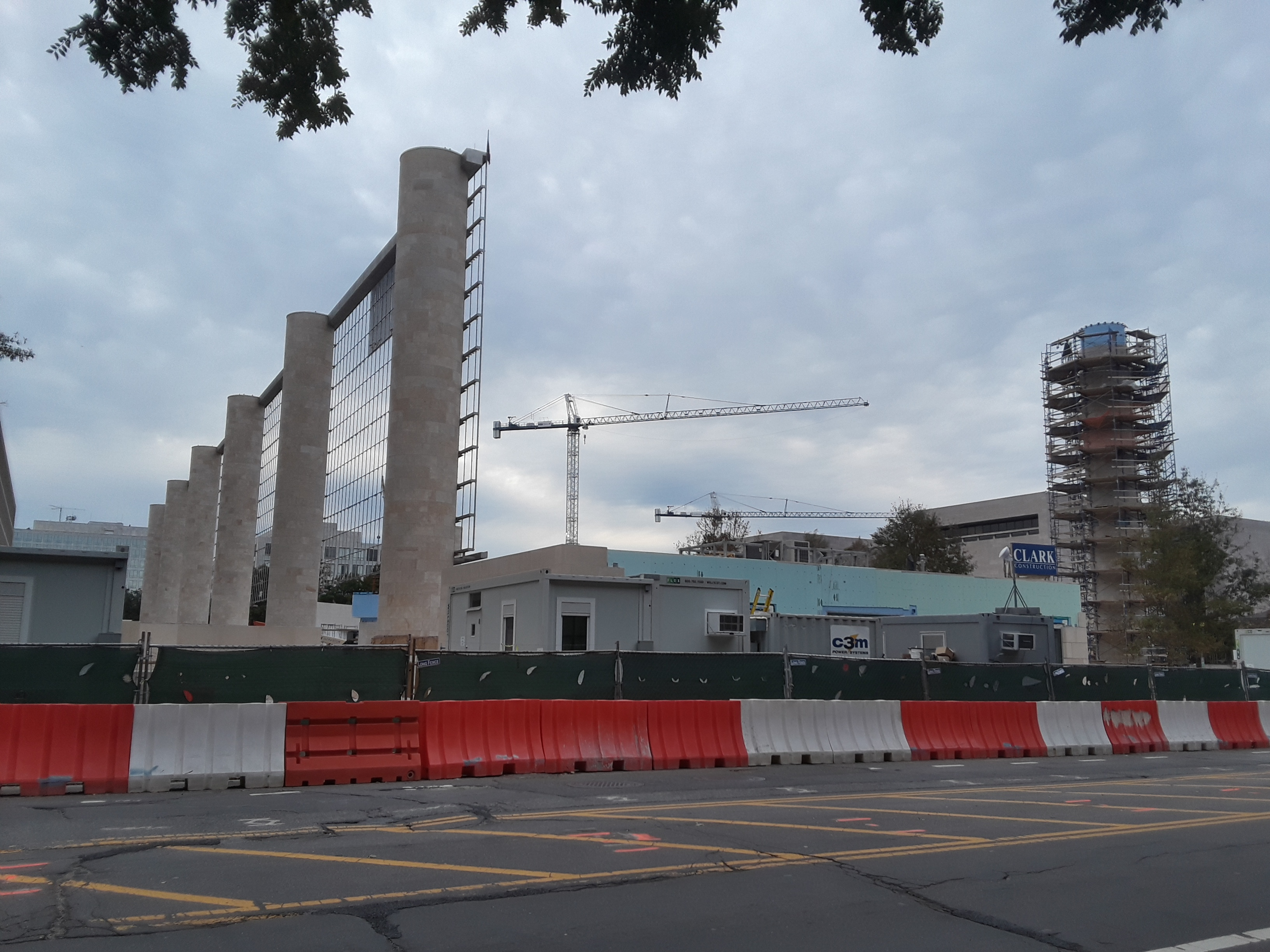
Site of the memorial under construction

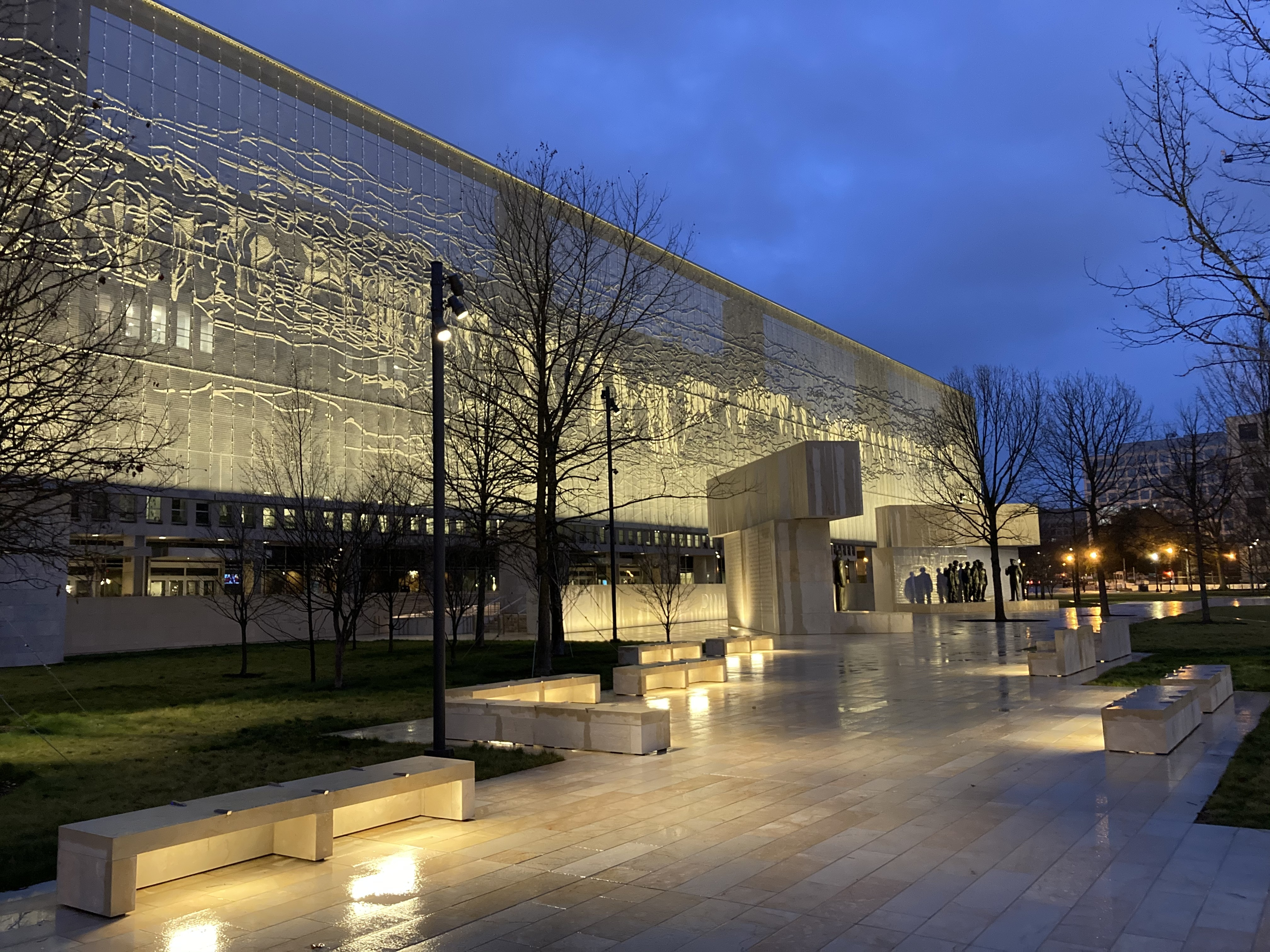
The memorial lit up at night

== See also ==
- List of national memorials of the United States
- List of sculptures of presidents of the United States
- Presidential memorials in the United States
- List of works by Frank Gehry

== Bibliography ==
- Booker, Simeon; Booker, Carol McCabe (2013). Shocking the Conscience: A Reporter's Account of the Civil Rights Movement. Jackson, Miss.: University Press of Mississippi. ISBN 9781617037894.
- Clinton, Bill (2001). Mosley, Raymond A.; Carling, John W. (eds.). Public Papers of the Presidents of the United States, William J. Clinton: 2000-2001. Book I, January 1 to June 26, 2000. Washington, D.C.: United States Government Printing Office.
- Committee on Energy and Natural Resources (June 26, 2007). Dwight D. Eisenhower Memorial Commission. S.Rept. 110-97. 110th Cong., 1st sess (Report). Washington, D.C.: U.S. Government Printing Office.
- Eisenhower Memorial Commission (March 4, 2013). Fiscal Year 2015 Budget Justification: Working with Congressional Partners to Build the Permanent Memorial to General and President Dwight D. Eisenhower (PDF) (Report). Washington, D.C.: Eisenhower Memorial Commission. Archived from the original (PDF) on October 6, 2014.
- MacKenzie, G. Calvin (2001). "The State of the Presidential Appointments Process". In MacKenzie, G. Calvin (ed.). Innocent Until Nominated: The Breakdown of the Presidential Appointments Process. Washington, D.C.: Brookings Institution Press. ISBN 0815754019.
