= Global War on Terrorism Memorial Foundation =

American non-profit organization

The Global War on Terrorism Memorial Foundation is an American 501(c)(3) non-profit organization established in 2015 to plan, fund, and build a national memorial focused on the Global War on Terrorism on the National Mall in Washington, D.C. Congressional authorization for the memorial came through the Global War on Terrorism War Memorial Act of 2017.

In April 2023, the National Capital Planning Commission authorized the Foundation to move forward with a site at Constitution Avenue and 23rd Street NW.

== Foundation ==
The Global War on Terror Memorial Foundation was formed in 2015 as a 501(c)(3) nonprofit corporation by a small group of veterans, military spouses, and citizens seeking to honor the service and sacrifice of all who served in the Global War on Terrorism.

Michael "Rod" Rodriguez, a former U.S. Army Green Beret, became the president and CEO of the foundation on January 3, 2022. President George W. Bush serves as the foundation's Honorary Chairman. The foundation's leadership structure also entails a board of directors. The chairman of the board is Theodore "Ted" Skokos, a retired U.S. Army officer and entrepreneur.

== Global War on Terrorism War Memorial Act (2017) ==
In its first two years of existence, the foundation lobbied the United States Congress to pass the Global War on Terrorism Memorial Act. The legislation, which passed the U.S. House of Representatives and U.S. Senate by unanimous consent and was signed into law by President Donald Trump on August 18, 2017, authorized the establishment of a national war memorial on federal land in Washington, D.C. The Global War on Terrorism Memorial Act entrusts the foundation to oversee the fundraising, design, and construction of the memorial in accordance with federal law, and exempts the memorial from the customary 10-year statutory waiting period after the formal conclusion of the associated conflict. It also prohibits the use of federal funds for the memorial.

== Global War on Terrorism Memorial Location Act (2021) ==
From 2019 to 2021, the Foundation advocated for the passage of the Global War on Terrorism Memorial Location Act, which authorizes construction of a memorial specifically within the Reserve area of the National Mall — an area otherwise closed to new commemorative works. Legislation approving placement on the National Mall was incorporated into the 2022 National Defense Authorization Act, which President Joe Biden signed into law on December 27, 2021.

The Commemorative Works Act sets a seven-year timeline for the Foundation to raise funds and finalize a design of the memorial, giving them until 2028 unless extended by Congress.

== Site selection and design ==
The construction of a memorial on federal land in Washington, D.C., is a 24-step process as set forth by the National Capital Planning Commission (NCPC). In April 2023, the NCPC staff recommended advancing a site at Constitution Avenue and 23rd Street NW near the Vietnam Veterans Memorial and the planned National Desert Storm and Desert Shield Memorial and a site on the Potomac River near the Franklin Delano Roosevelt Memorial. The Foundation subsequently announced it would move forward with the Constitution Avenue site, putting it in steps 13-19 for design approval.

In July 2023, the Foundation selected Marlon Blackwell Architects to design the memorial. An initial design featuring a grass-covered archway and plaza was released in June 2026.

== Existing memorials ==
Currently only three nationally oriented memorials honor each of the service members killed in action during the Global War on Terrorism. An additional (fourth) memorial includes many service members. There are several state memorials which focus on service members from specific states. Additionally, there is a memorial in London honoring British service personnel.

=== National memorials ===
The names of the fallen are based on the Defense Casualty Analysis System. The central objective of the system is to collect and maintain U.S. casualty information on warfighters who have fallen in global or regional conflicts involving the United States. It is generally thought that this list includes all service members who died while in the Global War on Terrorism theater of operations, regardless of their cause of death. The data reports are used by DoD organizations, external government agencies, both houses of Congress, the President, the news media, and the general public.

A Global War on Terrorism Memorial was dedicated in 2017 at the National Infantry Museum at Fort Monroe (previously Fort Benning) in Columbus, Georgia. The names of the fallen are engraved alphabetically on granite panels which are updated annually. The elements of the memorial include concrete pillars representing the Twin Towers, a steel beam from the wreckage of the North Tower, and bronze statues depicting an infantry squad.

The Northwood Gratitude & Honor Memorial is located at Northwood Community Park in Irvine, California. This memorial is the nation's first permanent memorial dedicated exclusively to listing the names of all fallen American service members in Afghanistan and Iraq. The memorial originated as a temporary, seasonal memorial in 2003. The permanent memorial was dedicated in 2010. The names are engraved on granite panels. The memorial is cared for by a committee of area residents plus city and park staff members.

The Wall of Honor, originally called Faces of the Fallen, is a traveling wall honoring the military members killed in action since 9/11. The wall was created in 2003 by a high school senior, and since 2014 has been cared for and updated by Vets Helping Vets HQ located in Albany, Oregon. The Wall of Honor display is unique because with the name of each service member it contains a picture of the fallen as well as information including the service member's home town, age, and unit. The wall is organized chronologically and is separated by conflict. Other elements of the display include flags of each branch of the United States Armed Forces, a battlefield cross and a POW/MIA or Missing Man Table.

Two identical Iraq-Afghanistan, Remembering Our Fallen traveling displays also honor fallen military members from the Global War on Terrorism. The displays created in 2017 and 2020 include both military and personal photos on banners that are hung from tribute towers. Photos of those who died in stateside or non-combat training accidents can also be included. It is believed that not all of the service members who died while in the Global War on Terrorism theater of operations are included as part of the display.

=== State memorials ===
Oregon Afghan-Iraq Freedom Memorial – dedicated in 2006 on the Oregon Department of Veterans' Affairs grounds in Salem, Oregon.

Massachusetts Iraq and Afghanistan Fallen Heroes Memorial – dedicated in 2016 in Boston, Massachusetts.

Connecticut Afghanistan Iraq Veterans War Memorial – dedicated in 2024 in Danbury, Connecticut.

Florida Iraq and Afghanistan Memorial – dedicated in 2024 in Port St. Lucie, Florida.

Washington (state) currently raising funds for a memorial.

=== International memorials ===
United Kingdom: Iraq and Afghanistan Memorial – dedicated in 2017 in London.
