= Gold Star Mothers National Monument =

The Gold Star Mothers National Monument was a proposed national memorial to honor mothers whose children died in defense of the United States. The name of the memorial refers to the Gold Star Mothers Club, formed in the aftermath of World War I. A mother whose child had died in honorable military service while serving during the time of war was permitted to hang in her window a service flag with a gold star emblazoned on it.

The United States Congress authorized the Gold Star Mothers National Monument Foundation on January 2, 2013, in Section 2859 of the National Defense Authorization Act for Fiscal Year 2013 (Pub. L. 112–239 (text) (PDF)). The foundation was authorized to raise private funds to construct a memorial on federal land in Washington, D.C. Once established, the memorial would be turned over to the federal government. Congress permitted the memorial to be constructed within Area 1, the central core of the District of Columbia centered on the National Mall, or Area II (adjacent to the National Mall and nearby federal lands).

Under the rules established by the Commemorative Works Clarification and Revision Act of 2003 (CWCRA), the memorial foundation had seven years (until January 2, 2020) to raise the necessary funds to build the memorial, and to obtain siting, design, and other approvals from the National Capital Memorial Advisory Commission (NCMAC), United States Commission of Fine Arts, and National Capital Planning Commission.

Although a bill (H.R. 2819) was introduced to extend authorization to 2024, it did not advance and permission to build the memorial lapsed.

In December 2013, the foundation laid out its goals for a national monument. They included:

- Expressing the gratitude of the nation to Gold Star mothers and families;
- Recognizing the loss incurred by Gold Star mothers and families;
- Giving Gold Star mothers and families a place to reflect, contemplate, and meditate on their loss;
- Giving Gold Star mothers and families a place to gather;
- Commemorating the national service that the Gold Star Mothers Club has provided to the nation; and
- Providing a place for the public to acknowledge the sacrifices of Gold Star mothers and families, and to commemorative this sacrifice.

The foundation began analyzing sites suggested by the NCMAC in 2013. It rejected Freedom Plaza, the belvedere western terminus of Constitution Avenue on the shores of the Potomac River, and sites on Memorial Drive close to the Arlington National Cemetery Administration Building. On December 12, 2013, it asked the NCMAC to approve a site on Memorial Drive between the south main gate of Arlington National Cemetery and the Armored Forces Memorial.
