= National Liberty Memorial =

Proposed memorial in Washington, D.C.

The National Liberty Memorial is a proposed national memorial in Washington, D.C. to honor African Americans in the Revolutionary War. The memorial is an outgrowth of a failed effort to erect a Black Revolutionary War Patriots Memorial, which was authorized in 1986 but whose memorial foundation dissolved in 2005. Congress authorized the National Liberty Memorial in January 2013; this authorization expired in 2021 but was renewed in December 2022 in the Consolidated Appropriations Act, 2023. The memorial foundation will now have until September 30, 2027 to raise enough funds to begin construction.

== Push for the memorial ==
In 1980, Lena Santos Ferguson, an African American woman, applied for membership in the Daughters of the American Revolution (DAR), an organization for descendants of those who fought in the American Revolutionary War. Despite having excellent documentation of her ancestry and her ancestor's participation in the war, she could not find two members anywhere in the national organization to sponsor her for membership. Margaret Johnston, a member of the Mary Washington chapter of the DAR and wife of a General Motors executive, said, "It was made clear to me that [Ferguson] was not welcome because she is black." DAR national president Sarah King admitted that blacks were not being admitted as members, but also claimed that some individuals were also disliked by existing members, were divorced, or rejected out of spite. In 1983, Ferguson was granted "limited" membership in the DAR, which meant she did not have voting rights and could not belong to a local chapter (where the work of the organization was conducted).

After the Council of the District of Columbia threatened to revoke the DAR's city tax exemption and Ferguson threatened to sue to revoke its federal tax exemption, the DAR admitted Ferguson as a full member.

The DAR and Ferguson negotiated an agreement in which the DAR would help minorities become part of the society, state in its membership materials that all people of whatever race were eligible for membership, offer scholarships to students in the District of Columbia (where the overwhelming majority of students were black), educate the DAR membership about the role African Americans played in the Revolutionary War, and identify all African Americans (slave or free) who fought in the war. (Note: Since many U.S. states prohibited miscegenation, and slave marriages were not recognized, it proved difficult for many blacks to establish clear ancestral links to those who fought in the war. Many in the DAR opposed recognition of these individuals on the grounds that this would loosen the organization's rules about direct and proveable ancestry. This debate seriously inhibited the DAR's research, and the list of the 2,400 African Americans (slave and free) who fought in the Revolution did not appear until 2001. In 2008, updated research listed 6,600 blacks and Native Americans who fought in the war.) The DAR also agreed to support a congressional resolution to establish a national memorial in Washington, D.C., honoring African Americans who fought in the Revolutionary War.

=== Black Revolutionary War Patriots Memorial ===
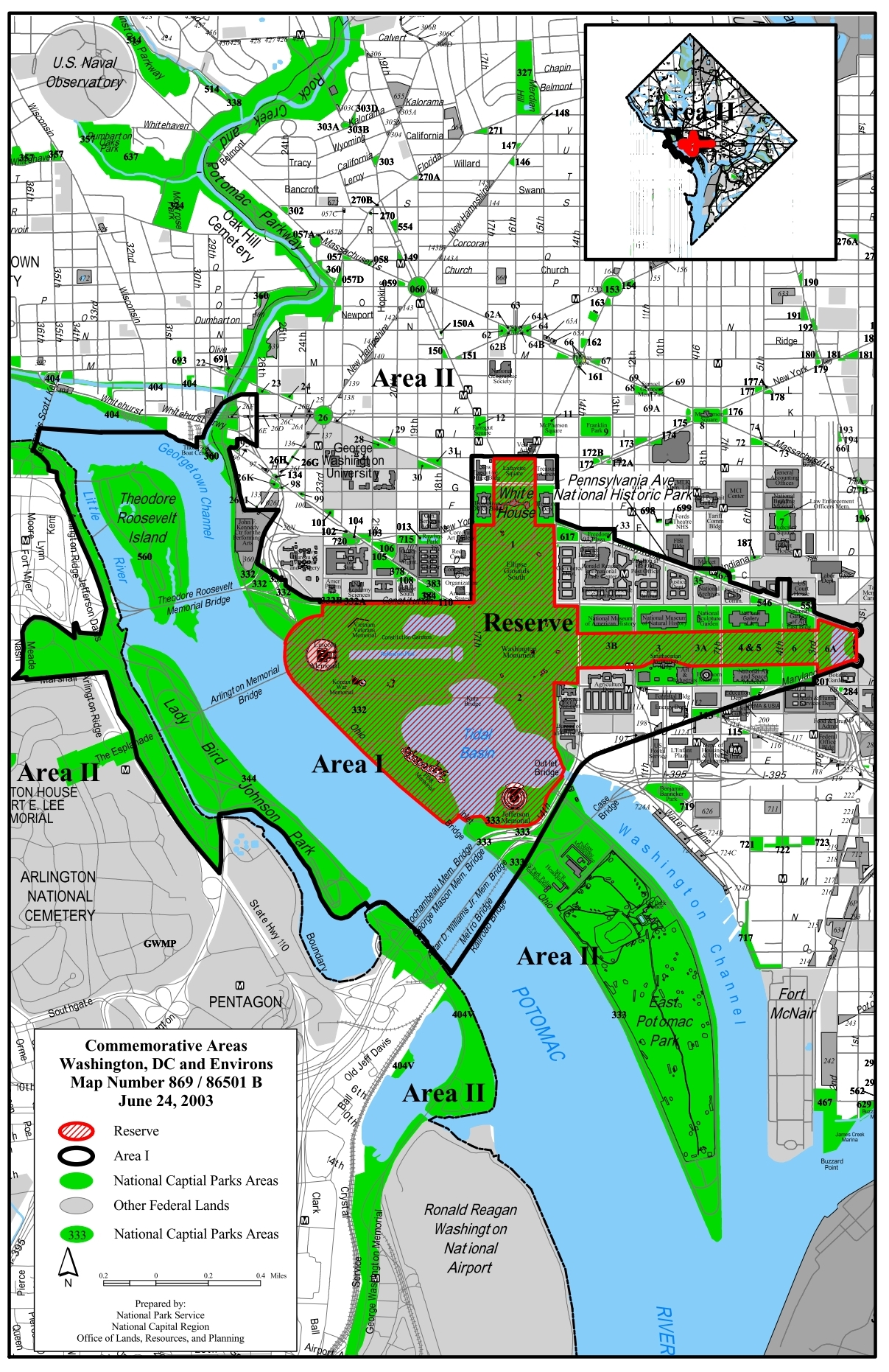
Map showing Area I (within the black border) of the National Capital Area, where the Black Revolutionary War Patriots Memorial could have been constructed.

Meanwhile, momentum was building in Congress for a memorial. The memorial had its genesis in a resolution introduced in Congress by Representative Nancy Johnson, a Republican from Connecticut. Her bill was a proclamation honoring black Revolutionary War patriots. The resolution was conceived by Maurice Barboza, Ferguson's nephew and a member of the Sons of the American Revolution. Barboza saw the bill as a means of pushing the DAR to admit his aunt, but it was quickly approved by Congress and President Ronald Reagan signed it into law (P.L. 98-245) on March 27, 1984. Realizing there was support in Congress, Barboza asked Johnson to sponsor legislation for a physical memorial. She agreed. DAR President King prevailed on a friend, Senator Al Gore (a Democrat from Tennessee), to sponsor identical legislation in the Senate. He agreed. After just 17 months, the bill was adopted by Congress and President Reagan signed the Black Revolutionary War Patriots Act (P.L. 99-558) into law on October 27, 1986. The act forbade the use of federal funds to build the memorial (a typical requirement by Congress). Instead, it established a nonprofit, the Black Revolutionary War Patriots Memorial Foundation, to solicit funds to build the memorial.

The foundation selected Constitution Gardens on the National Mall for the site of its memorial. Constitution Gardens is a lightly forested area and pond bounded on the west by the Vietnam Veterans Memorial, on the east by 17th Street NW, on the north by Constitution Avenue NW, and on the south by the Lincoln Memorial Reflecting Pool. The area, formerly occupied by temporary federal buildings, was created in 1976 as a United States Bicentennial tribute. In July 1982, the Memorial to the 56 Signers of the Declaration of Independence was dedicated on the island in the lake. This memorial is a low, curved stone wall facing the water and encompassing a tiny patio. Because the Commemorative Works Act (CWA) of 1986 (P.L. 99-625) barred memorials on the National Mall unless they were of "preeminent" and "lasting" historical significance, Barboza was forced to seek congressional authorization to locate the Black Revolutionary War Patriots Memorial in Constitution Gardens. On March 25, 1988, President Reagan signed into law P.L. 100-265, allowing the memorial to be built in "Area I" (the National Mall and its immediate environs). Under the rules imposed by the CWA, the memorial foundation had seven years to complete fundraising, win approval of its design, and begin construction.

Barboza incorporated the foundation in 1985 with himself, Ferguson and Johnson as members of the founding board. After five years of self-funding the project and using volunteers, Barboza received a commitment from the General Motors Corporation to help raise funds. In May 1989, GM sponsored the "One Nation Dinner" in Washington, D.C. that raised $250,000 and introduced the project to dignitaries, corporations and government leaders. The group was off to a good start after a long and tedious struggle between 1985 and 1989. Later, after Johnson became chairman of the board, the group foundered over her efforts to wrest control from Barboza and Ferguson and recast the message of the memorial. All the while the forward movement of the project began to lose purpose. Barboza tried to oust Johnson from the board she had packed with acquaintances but was later voted off in 1992. Ferguson resigned.[12] Problems with the appropriateness of the design and the meddling of sculptor Edward Dwight also hindered fundraising and contributed to the debacle and waste that would come later.[13] From 1992 to 2005, extensions of the memorial construction deadline were granted by Congress four times. On October 20, 1996, Congress enacted the United States Commemorative Coin Act of 1996 (P.L. 104-329), which authorized the United States Mint to manufacture no more than 500,000 $1 commemorative coins. These coins, sold for $10 each, would be used to finance the memorial. But only 100,000 of the coins were sold during the year (1998) they were offered. Between 1996 and 1999, the foundation raised another $1.5 million for a total of $3.6 million in received contributions. But it spent $800,000 designing the memorial and another $1.8 million on salaries for staff, leaving it with just $1 million in its trust fund.

The memorial's design was also problematic. In 1990, architect Marshall Purnell proposed an elliptical plaza with seven 13-foot (4.0 m) high statues of African American Revolutionary War soldiers and citizens. The United States Commission of Fine Arts (CFA), which had design approval over all memorials in the National Capital Area, rejected the design as too monumental and too visible compared with the nearby Signers' Memorial. It counseled the foundation to eliminate the statues and seek a "landscape solution" as a memorial. In 1991, the memorial foundation held a charrette to seek a new design. Edward Dwight's design for a granite block with figures of African American soldiers and citizens emerging from swirling rock was chosen. The CFA liked the design, but repeatedly asked for changes over the next five years. Dwight became convinced that members of the CFA and the National Park Service had "an issue with putting black faces on the National Mall". Dwight's design was subsequently approved by the CFA. But the changes left the memorial without any monumental elements, too small and pinched to attract financial support.

Congressional authority to build the Black Revolutionary War Patriots Memorial expired on October 27, 2005. The memorial foundation dissolved, out of money.

== National Liberty Memorial ==
While the Black Revolutionary War Patriots Memorial was under design consideration, Congress enacted the Commemorative Works Clarification and Revision Act of 2003 (CWCRA). This law barred the erection of any memorial in Area I without the approval of the National Capital Memorial Advisory Commission (NCMAC).

In 2005, Barboza established the National Mall Liberty Fund D.C., a nonprofit foundation to honor African Americans (slave and free) who fought in the American Revolutionary War, who provided assistance to the war effort as civilians, and who sought their freedom during the Revolutionary period. In April 2006, Senator Chris Dodd (Democratic from Connecticut) introduced legislation to approve the new memorial. Dodd's legislation, however, did not refer to African Americans or any other minority, simply to "slaves and other persons who fought" in the war. Barboza asked the NCMAC to transfer the Black Revolutionary War Patriots Memorial site approval to the National Liberty Memorial, but the agency declined to do so in 2007.

The Dodd legislation died at the end of the 109th United States Congress on December 8, 2006. Dodd introduced new legislation, with altered wording, in 2009, 2010, and 2011.

The Congress finally authorized the National Liberty Memorial on January 2, 2013, in Section 2859 of the National Defense Authorization Act for Fiscal Year 2013 (Pub. L. 112–239 (text) (PDF)). Congress declared the memorial to be a "commemorative work to slaves and free black persons who served in the American Revolution" as soldiers, sailors, or civilians. The National Mall Liberty Fund D.C. was authorized to build the memorial. Congress authorized the memorial to be constructed in Area I or Area II of the National Capital Area, but not in the Reserve area designated by federal law. National Mall Liberty Fund D.C. was also authorized to begin raising private funds to construct a memorial, which would be turned over to the federal government upon completion.

Under the rules established by the 2003 CWCRA, the National Mall Liberty Fund D.C. had seven years (until January 2, 2020) to raise the necessary funds to build the memorial, and to obtain siting, design, and other approvals from the NCMAC, CFA, and National Capital Planning Commission.

=== Preliminary memorial design and site ===
The National Mall Liberty Fund D.C. hired sculptor David Newton to design a preliminary memorial. Newton's draft depicts an African American father, mother, and child. The father is armed with a rifle, but not depicted as a soldier. The mother points toward the nearby Lincoln Memorial. The child wears a tricorne hat and is beating a drum.

On July 23, 2013, the memorial foundation presented its first site selection report to the NCMAC. The foundation examined 43 potential sites before creating a short-list of five preferred site: northwest of the Lincoln Memorial, the United States Department of the Interior triangle on Virginia Avenue NW, Walt Whitman Park, Freedom Plaza, and a site on the west side of the Jamie L. Whitten Building (the headquarters of the United States Department of Agriculture). The NCMAC asked the foundation to reconsider Walt Whitman Park, the Interior Department triangle, and a new site—the western terminus of Constitution Avenue NW (the "belvedere") on the shores of the Potomac River. After reconsidering these sites and the others originally studied, the foundation requested that the site at the Whitten Building be approved. The Whitten site received the support of Senator Chuck Grassley and Senator Chris Murphy on November 20, 2013. Because the Whitten site is in Area I, the most protected part of the National Mall, use of the site required approval by Congress.

On September 26, 2014, President Barack Obama signed legislation allowing the National Liberty Memorial to be placed on the National Mall on a site next to the Department of Agriculture Building, extending authority to begin construction to 2021. The legislation's sponsor, Rep. G. K. Butterfield (D-NC), said that "this eventual memorial will show the nation, it will show the world, that the sacrifices, the heroic efforts of African Americans, both slave and free, who took up arms for American independence are not forgotten."

The Commemorative Works Act authorization for the memorial expired on September 26, 2021, with the organization having not raised sufficient funds to begin construction. The Consolidated Appropriations Act, 2023 extended authorization until September 30, 2027.

== Bibliography ==
- Hass, Kristin Ann (2013). Sacrificing Soldiers on the National Mall. Berkeley: University of California Press. ISBN 978-0520274112.
