= Roger K. Lewis =

American architect (1941–2024)

- Born: Roger Kutnow Lewis; January 9, 1941; Houston, Texas, U.S.
- Died: October 2, 2024 (aged 83); Washington, D.C., U.S.
- Education: Massachusetts Institute of Technology (B.Arch., M.Arch.)
- Occupations: Architect, urban planner, professor, author, journalist, cartoonist
- Years active: 1964–2024
- Employer: University of Maryland, College Park
- Known for: Shaping the City column and cartoons Book Architect? A Candid Guide to the Profession
- Awards: Fellow of the American Institute of Architects; John Weibenson Award (2013)

Roger Kutnow Lewis, FAIA (January 9, 1941 – October 2, 2024), was an American architect and urban planner, and a professor of architecture at the University of Maryland, College Park, where he taught architectural design and other courses for 37 years, retiring in 2006. Also an author, journalist and cartoonist, Lewis wrote about architecture and urban design, and about how public policy shapes the built environment.

== Life and career ==
Lewis was born in Houston, Texas on January 9, 1941. He attended the Massachusetts Institute of Technology (MIT), earning a Bachelor of Architecture in 1964 and Master of Architecture in 1967.

From 1964 to 1966, Lewis served in the Peace Corps as a volunteer architect in Tunisia where he designed over 30 government-financed projects, half of which were built. In 1968, he joined the faculty at the new School of Architecture at the University of Maryland, College Park, to help start and develop the architecture program.

In 1969, Lewis launched his architecture and planning firm, based in Washington, D.C., authoring guidelines for developments and designing or co-designing a wide range of projects that include plans for new communities; market-rate and affordable multi-unit housing complexes; custom-designed private homes; elementary and middle schools; community centers; recreational facilities; and civic art centers. During his career, Lewis also served as a professional advisor for national and international design competitions.

Lewis died of complications from surgery at his home in Washington, D.C., on October 2, 2024, at the age of 83.

== Public service ==
From 1993 through 2022, Lewis was a member of the government-appointed Design Review Board for "Carlyle/Eisenhower East," growing sectors of the city of Alexandria, Virginia. In 1998 he was appointed by the U.S. General Services Administration to serve as a member of the G.S.A. Design Excellence Peer Review Committee.

From 2007 until 2018 he was a regular guest discussing "Shaping the City" issues on the Kojo Nnamdi radio show, broadcast by American University's National Public Radio affiliate WAMU-FM.

From 2009 until his death Lewis served as the president of the Peace Corps Commemorative Foundation (PCCF). In January 2014 Congress authorized the PCCF to create a commemorative work honoring the historic significance of the Peace Corps and the American ideals embodied and expressed by Peace Corps service.(Public Law 113-78) Starting in 2015 the PCCF has received and reviewed many design concepts to be built on a federally owned site in Washington, D.C. which will be managed and maintained by the U.S. National Park Service.

In 2015-16, Lewis served as a consultant to the National World War I Memorial (Washington, D.C.) design competition.

== Journalist and cartoonist ==
From 1984 The Washington Post published Lewis' award-winning "Shaping the City" column, illustrated with his cartoons. He addressed a broad range of issues: architecture and urban design; land use planning and regulation; affordable housing; historic preservation; smart growth; sustainability; and public policy affecting the built environment.

His "Shaping the City" cartoons have been the subject of several one-man exhibitions, among them: the National Building Museum; "The Design Comedy", at the American Institute of Architects national headquarters; and "30 Years of Shaping the City", at the District Architecture Center in Washington, D.C. He also has been commissioned to draw original cartoons published in books and articles by other writers.

== Author ==
Lewis' book, Architect? A Candid Guide to the Profession ISBN 978-0-262-51884-0, was first published by the MIT Press in 1985, with revised editions published in 1998 and 2013. Editions of Architect? have been translated and published in Japanese ISBN 4306061051, Spanish ISBN 9681857267, Korean ISBN 8970231110 and Chinese ISBN 9787302469957. His second book, Shaping the City, a collection of his Washington Post columns and cartoons, was published in 1987 by the AIA Press. ISBN 0-913962-88-0 He also co-authored The Growth Management Handbook [OCLC 20815126], a "primer for citizen and government planners on the concepts of growth management and regional planning," published in 1989.

== Awards and recognitions ==
Roger K. Lewis was elected a Fellow of the American Institute of Architects College of Fellows (FAIA) in 1986. In 2013 the D.C. AIA chapter conferred on him the annual John Weibenson Award for Architecture in the Public Interest.

== Videos ==
- Fall Design Fête 2013 - AIA|DC John 'Wieb' Wiebenson Award
