= Desert Shield and Desert Storm Memorial =

War memorial in Washington, DC, United States

- People at the memorial dedication, October 24, 2026

- Location within Central Washington, D.C. Location within the District of Columbia
- Location: Washington, D.C.
- Coordinates: 38°53′30″N 77°03′02″W
- Established: October 24, 2026
- Governing body: National Park Service
- Website: Desert Shield and Desert Storm Memorial

The Desert Shield and Desert Storm Memorial honors members of the armed forces who participated in Operation Desert Storm or Operation Desert Shield in the Gulf War in 1990 and 1991. The national memorial is in Washington, D.C. near the Lincoln Memorial.

=== History and advocacy ===
The concept for the memorial originated in 2010 with Scott C. Stump, a Marine Corps Reserve veteran of the Gulf War, who observed that the conflict was in danger of becoming a "footnote in history" between the Vietnam and Iraq Wars. Stump founded and served as President and CEO of the National Desert Storm Memorial Association (NDSMA) to champion the monument's creation. He spearheaded a 16-year advocacy and federal approval campaign spanning four presidential administrations, organizing fundraising efforts that successfully generated over $40 million in private donations—backed heavily by a major grant from the State of Kuwait and support from the Veterans of Foreign Wars (VFW)—to fully fund the construction under the requirements of the 2014 federal authorizing legislation.

The National Desert Storm and Desert Shield War Memorial Act (H.R. 503) authorized the National Desert Storm Memorial Association to establish a memorial in the capital without use of federal funds. The bill was incorporated into Howard P. "Buck" McKeon National Defense Authorization Act for Fiscal Year 2015 (H.R. 3979) and was enacted in December 2014.

The memorial's design was approved in 2023, and construction took place in 2025 and 2026; the memorial was dedicated on October 24, 2026.

== Background ==
The Gulf War (2 August 1990 – 28 February 1991), codenamed Operation Desert Storm (17 January 1991 – 28 February 1991) was a war waged by coalition forces from 34 nations led by the United States against Iraq in response to Iraq's invasion and annexation of Kuwait.

The war is also known under other names, such as the Persian Gulf War, First Gulf War, Kuwait War, or the First Iraq War, after the term "Iraq War" became identified instead with the 2003 Iraq War. Kuwait's invasion by Iraqi troops that began 2 August 1990 was met with international condemnation, and brought immediate economic sanctions against Iraq by members of the U.N. Security Council. U.S. President George H. W. Bush deployed U.S. forces into Saudi Arabia, and urged other countries to send their own forces to the scene. An array of nations joined the Coalition, the biggest coalition since World War II. The great majority of the Coalition's military forces were from the U.S., with Saudi Arabia, the United Kingdom and Egypt as leading contributors, in that order. Saudi Arabia paid around US$36 billion of the US$60 billion cost.

Operation Desert Shield was the codename for a "wholly defensive" United States mission to prevent Iraq from invading Saudi Arabia. Operation Desert Shield began on 7 August 1990 when U.S. troops were sent to Saudi Arabia due also to the request of its monarch, King Fahd, who had earlier called for U.S. military assistance. This "wholly defensive" doctrine was quickly abandoned when, on 8 August, Iraq declared Kuwait to be Iraq's 19th province and Saddam named his cousin, Ali Hassan Al-Majid, as its military-governor.

Approximately 500,000 Americans served in operations Desert Storm and Desert Shield. There were 382 American fatalities.

== Provisions of the bill ==
National Desert Storm and Desert Shield War Memorial Act
- Long title: To authorize the National Desert Storm Memorial Association to establish the National Desert Storm and Desert Shield Memorial as a commemorative work in the District of Columbia, and for other purposes.
- Announced in: the 113th United States Congress
- Sponsored by: Rep. David P. Roe (R, TN-1)
- Number of co-sponsors: 12

Codification
- Acts affected: Internal Revenue Code of 1986, Commemorative Works Act
- U.S.C. sections affected: 40 U.S.C. § 8906, 40 U.S.C. ch. 89, 40 U.S.C. § 8903
- Agencies affected: United States Department of the Interior

Legislative history
- Introduced in the House as H.R. 503 by Rep. David P. Roe (R, TN-1) on February 5, 2013; Committee consideration by United States House Committee on Natural Resources, United States House Natural Resources Subcommittee on Public Lands and Environmental Regulation; Passed the House on May 28, 2014 (Roll Call Vote 242: 370-0)

This summary is based largely on the summary provided by the Congressional Research Service, a public domain source.

The National Desert Storm and Desert Shield War Memorial Act authorized the National Desert Storm Memorial Association to establish a commemorative work on federal land in the District of Columbia to commemorate and honor those who, as members of the Armed Forces, served on active duty in support of Operation Desert Storm or Operation Desert Shield.

The bill prohibited the use of federal funds to pay any expense to establish the commemorative work.

The bill required the Association, upon payment of all expenses for the memorial's establishment (including perpetual maintenance and preservation expenses), to transmit any remaining balance to the United States Secretary of the Interior for deposit in the separate account with the National Park Foundation (NPF) established for crediting money provided by a sponsor of a commemorative work.

The bill required any remaining balance transmitted to the separate NPF account upon expiration of the authority to establish the commemorative work to be available to the Secretary or to the Administrator of the General Services Administration (GSA), as appropriate, following a specified process.

== Procedural history ==
The National Desert Storm and Desert Shield War Memorial Act was introduced into the United States House of Representatives on February 5, 2014 by Rep. David P. Roe (R, TN-1). The bill was referred to the United States House Committee on Natural Resources and the United States House Natural Resources Subcommittee on Public Lands and Environmental Regulation. The bill was reported (amended) by the committee on May 6, 2014 alongside House Report 113-437.

Rep. Roe, who introduced the bill, said "I believe we should honor the commitment of every man and woman that honorably serves this country, and I am proud to see this bill move forward."

AMVETS supported the bill, with their National Executive Director Stewart Hickey saying that they were pleased that "Gulf War veterans can finally be recognized for their valiant service to our nation." The American Legion, the National Guard Association of the United States, and the Air Force Association also supported the bill.

On May 28, 2014, the House voted in Roll Call Vote 242 to pass the bill 370-0. It was subsequently passed into law as part of the 2015 National Defense Authorization Act, which removed "War" from the title.

== Monument planning ==
A subsequent bill enacted in March 2017 authorized the construction in the restricted Area 1 near the National Mall. The Commission of Fine Arts approved a location north of the Lincoln Memorial at the southwest corner of Constitution Avenue and 23rd Street Northwest in 2018 and approved a conceptual design in November 2019.

Lead designer OLIN had anticipated completion in 2021. The National Capital Planning Commission approved final site development plans on September 7, 2023.

As of November 2019, the National Desert Storm Memorial Association still had to raise another $22 million of its $40 million goal before it can begin construction. The nation of Kuwait is the largest donor, pledging $10 million in 2020 and additional support in 2022.

In 2022, the National Desert Storm Memorial Association announced the name of the memorial was revised from National Desert Storm and Desert Shield Memorial to Desert Shield and Desert Storm Memorial, which put the operations in chronological order and made the name consistent with other memorials on the National Mall that omit "National".

== Construction and dedication ==
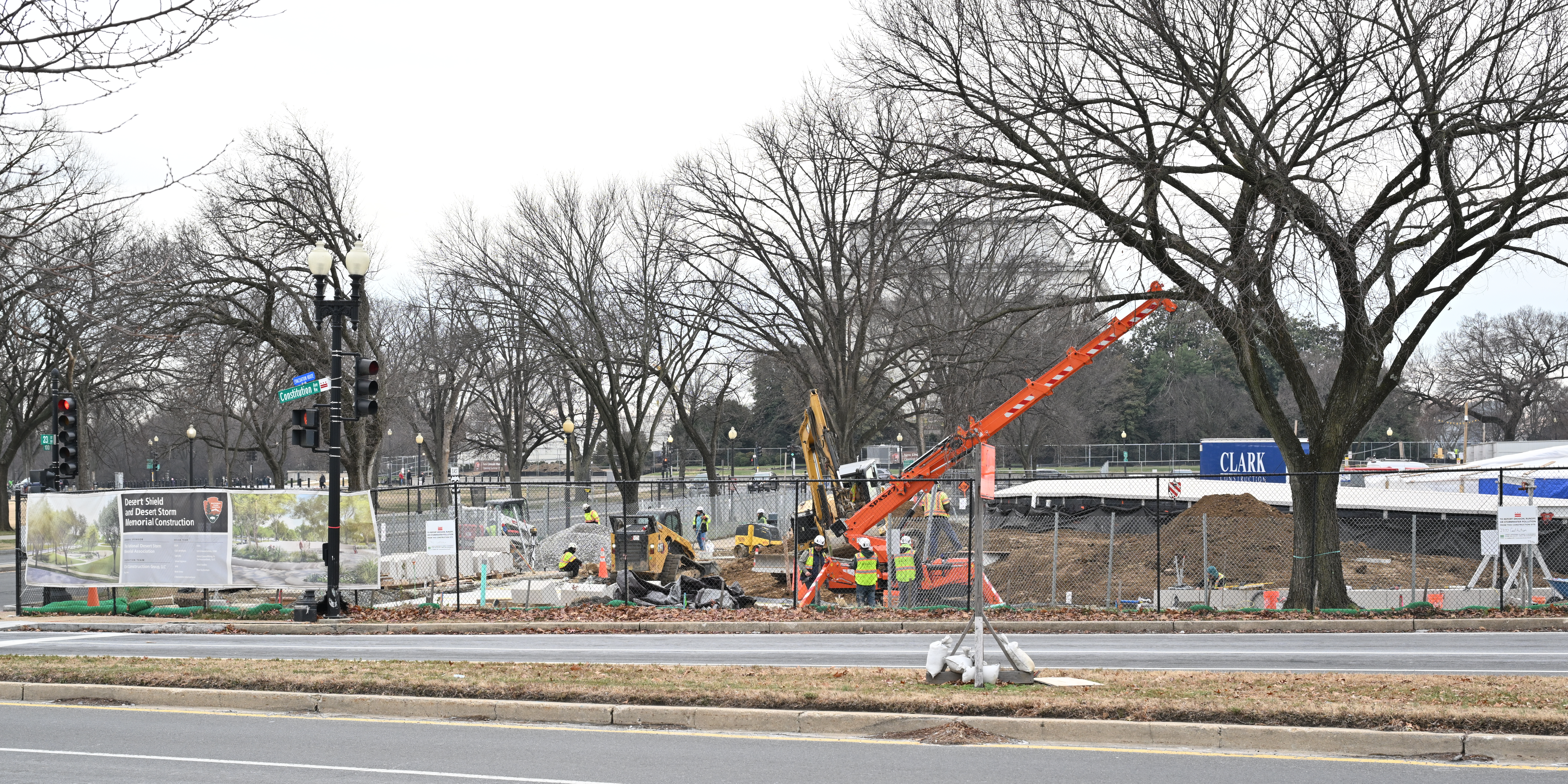
Construction of the Desert Storm Memorial, December 17, 2025

A ceremonial groundbreaking for the memorial occurred at its future location on July 14, 2022.

The Memorial Association stated it had received a construction permit on March 6, 2025, and planned for completion in 2026.

People at the Desert Storm and Desert Shield memorial dedication ceremony, October 24, 2026

Veteran standing next to the bald eagle and falcon, October 24. 2026

The memorial's dedication ceremony was on October 24, 2026; speakers included Interior Secretary Doug Burgum, Former congressman Phil Roe, Kuwait's ambassador to the U.S. Sheika Al-Zain Al-Sabah, and the Kuwait Minister of Defense Sheikh Abdullah Ali Abdullah Al-Salem Al-Sabah. Thousands of people attended, watching it on a large jumbotron screen across the street.

The memorial is administered as part of the National Mall and Memorial Parks unit.

=== Design and artwork ===
The architectural layout, master planning, and structural engineering of the memorial were collaboratively executed by the firms CSO Architects and OLIN, with the design team utilizing a "left hook" spiral pathway enclosed by golden-beige granite walls inspired by wind-sculpted desert sand dunes.

The physical construction and sculptural elements involved an international supply chain and collaboration between individual master artists and advanced fabrication technologies:

- **Material Sourcing and Fabrication:** The memorial's primary structural medium is Giallo Antico granite, specifically selected for its sand-like texture and golden hue to evoke the Middle Eastern desert landscape. The raw granite blocks were quarried in Brazil and shipped across the Atlantic Ocean to the historic stone-working hub of Carrara, Italy, for precision cutting, robotic rough-shaping, and final hand-carving before being transported to the United States for final installation.
- **Emily Bedard** served as the art director and lead sculptor responsible for designing the 250-foot-long "Storm Wall." Bedard hand-crafted the original one-third-scale clay bas-reliefs in her New York studio. These models were digitally scanned to direct robotic Computer Numerical Control (CNC) milling machines in Carrara to rough-carve the Brazilian granite blocks, which Bedard then meticulously hand-finished on-site in Italy. The completed reliefs portray American servicemen, military hardware, and the tactical progression of the campaign leading to the liberation of Kuwait.
- **Robert J. Eccleston**, a sculptor and U.S. Army veteran, crafted the monumental stainless steel raptor statues that frame the bas-relief. The compositions feature an American bald eagle and a Kuwaiti saker falcon, which symbolize the international coalition and the liberation of Kuwait.
- **Jim Garland** and his specialty firm, **Fluidity Design Consultants**, engineered the central water feature. The element consists of a 28-foot-diameter bronze "Unity Shield" fountain engraved with the names of the 41 coalition nations, featuring cascading water to evoke a sanctuary oasis.
- **Hervé Descottes** and **Jenny Ivansson** of **L'Observatoire International** served as the lead lighting designers, configuring the illumination to adapt to changing natural light patterns and visually animate the dramatic relief textures on the curved dune walls after sunset.

== See also ==
- Media related to National Desert Shield and Desert Storm Memorial at Wikimedia Commons
- List of bills in the 113th United States Congress
- List of national memorials of the United States
