= List of national memorials of the United States =

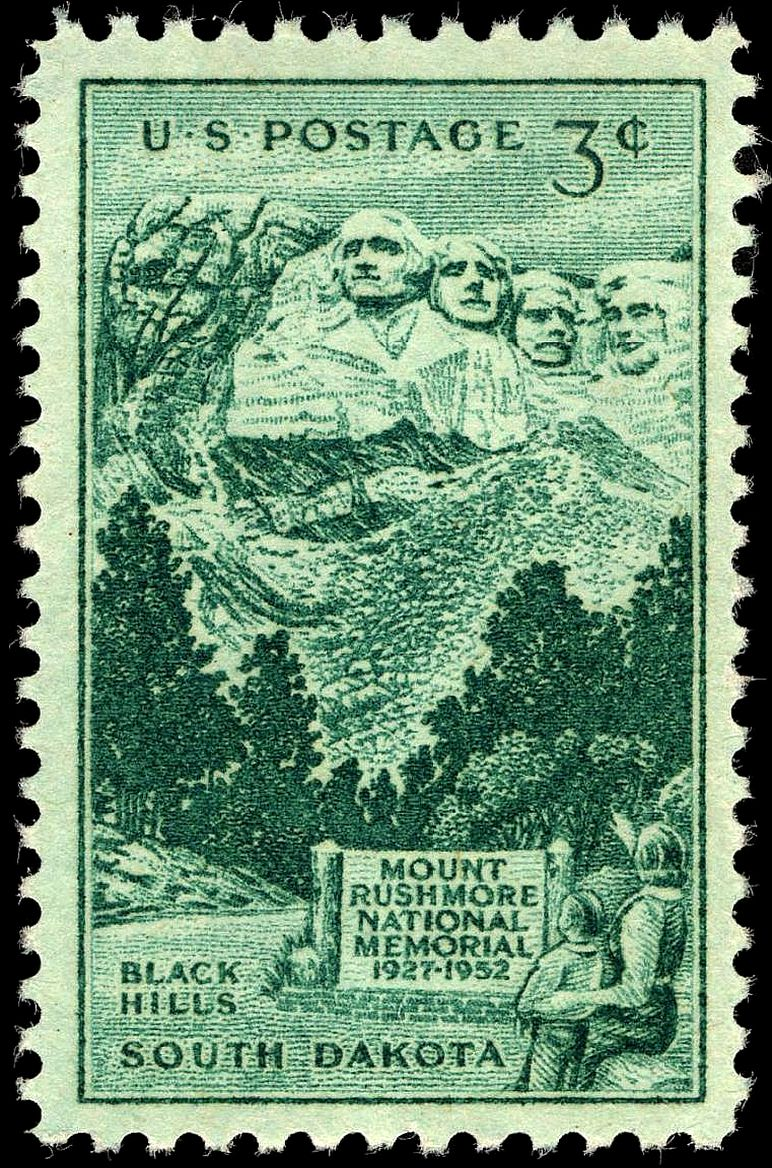
Mount Rushmore National Memorial on a commemorative 1952 stamp

National memorial is a designation in the United States for an officially recognized area that memorializes a historic person or event. As of October 2026 the National Park Service (NPS), an agency of the Department of the Interior, owns and administers 32 memorials as official units and provides assistance for 5 more, known as affiliated areas, that are operated by other organizations. Congress has also designated twenty-two additional independently operated sites as national memorials. Another four memorials have been authorized and are in the planning stage. Memorials need not be located on a site directly related to the subject, and many, such as the Lincoln Memorial, do not have the word "national" in their titles. There is a degree of overlap in development of some areas designated as memorials, monuments, and historic sites, and their characterization is not always consistent with their names, such as whether the site is closely associated with whom it memorializes.

The earliest and perhaps most recognizable is the uniquely designated Washington Monument, which was completed in 1884 and transferred to the NPS in 1933. The most recently established is the Dwight D. Eisenhower Memorial, dedicated in 2020. The Pearl Harbor National Memorial was created out of the World War II Valor in the Pacific National Monument in 2019 and was previously just the USS Arizona Memorial. The NPS national memorials are in 15 states and the District of Columbia. Washington, D.C., has the most, thirteen, followed by Pennsylvania and New York, each with three. The affiliated areas are in four states (two additional beyond those with NPS memorials) and the Northern Mariana Islands, while the other sites are in nine states (five additional), the District of Columbia, and Midway Atoll. Creation of new memorials in Washington, D.C. is governed by the Commemorative Works Act, while outside the District there are no systematic regulations.

Among the NPS national memorials and affiliated areas, ten celebrate US presidents, eleven recognize other historic figures, seven commemorate wars, five memorialize disasters, and five represent early exploration. Eleven of the twenty-two non-NPS memorials commemorate wars or veterans, another ten represent groups of people who died for related reasons, and one relates to Native American history. Several major war memorials are located on or near the National Mall, contributing to the national identity. The historic areas within the National Park System are automatically listed on the National Register of Historic Places.

"National Memorial" is omitted below in the names of sites that include it; others may separate the two words or just use "Memorial", and there is also one international memorial included. Private and other organizations may use the name "national memorial" (such as George Washington Masonic National Memorial and National Memorial for Peace and Justice) but they are not officially designated by the federal government, and are not listed here, as they are not created pursuant to the statutory scheme.

== Official units of National Park Service ==
The National Park Service manages 32 national memorials as official units. It also oversees two more national memorials as part of other units, listed with the other national memorials. A few additional units, including Fort McHenry National Monument, include "national memorial" in their enabling legislation, but are not otherwise called that and are thus not listed here.

Name	Image	Location	Date established	Area	Description
Arkansas Post	Wooden posts in a semicircle around information boards and a cannon	Arkansas; 34.02°N 91.35°W	July 6, 1960	757.51 acres (3.0655 km^{2})	Henri de Tonti established the Arkansas Post in 1686 as the first European trading post in the Mississippi River Valley as part of French Louisiana. It grew into a small settlement and was the site of skirmishes with Native Americans before becoming part of New Spain in 1763 and the US in 1803 with the Louisiana Purchase. A Civil War battle was won by the Union there in 1863. Visitors can tour a reconstructed fort and archaeological remains of Native American, European, and American settlements.
Arlington House, The Robert E. Lee Memorial	Mansion with columns and a flagpole	Virginia; 38.881°N 77.073°W	June 25, 1955	28.08 acres (0.1136 km^{2})	This mansion was built by George Washington's adopted grandson George Washington Parke Custis, partially as a memorial to Washington. After Custis's death it was managed by his son-in-law Robert E. Lee, who became commander of the Confederate States Army. The US government seized it during the Civil War and established Arlington National Cemetery around it. The house and grounds have been restored with pre-war decor and artifacts of the Custis and Lee families.
Chamizal	Short building with Mexican and American flags flying	Texas; 31.77°N 106.45°W	February 4, 1974	54.90 acres (0.2222 km^{2})	Northward shifts in the Rio Grande led to a dispute over the Mexico–United States border between El Paso, Texas, and Ciudad Juárez. Summits and tribunals beginning in 1909 failed to resolve the controversy until a 1964 settlement transferred land on both sides of a rechanneled river. The museum and park next to the Bridge of the Americas checkpoint commemorate the resolution and international diplomacy.
Coronado	Desert valley with rolling hills and sparse trees	Arizona; 31.34°N 110.25°W	November 5, 1952	4,830.22 acres (19.5472 km^{2})	Francisco Vázquez de Coronado led the first European exploration of the Southwest, from Arizona to Kansas, finding the Grand Canyon. The site on the Mexican border, where Coronado entered what is now the US, includes a cave and hiking trails through ridges and canyons.
De Soto	Wooden gateway open to the ocean	Florida; 27.52°N 82.64°W	March 11, 1948	30 acres (0.12 km^{2})	Hernando de Soto led the first European exploration of the Southeast, searching for gold while trading and fighting with various Native American tribes before his death along the Mississippi River in 1542. The memorial at the 1539 landing site on Tampa Bay has a reconstructed camp, reenactment events, historic artifacts, and waterfront trails.
Desert Shield and Desert Storm Memorial		District of Columbia; 38.891°N 77.051°W	October 24, 2026		Commemorates the events and veterans of the Gulf War, a six-month troop buildup and conflict that ended the Iraqi invasion of Kuwait. The design features curving walls representing phases of the conflict and a shield representing the coalition of participating nations.
Dwight D. Eisenhower Memorial		District of Columbia; 38.89°N 77.02°W	September 17, 2020	3.39 acres (0.0137 km^{2})	Dwight D. Eisenhower was the Supreme Commander of the Allied Forces in Europe during World War II and President of the United States in the 1950s. His accomplishments included enforcing school integration, creating NASA and the Interstate Highway System, and ending the Korean War. The memorial features stacked blocks showing quotations; sculptures depicting Eisenhower as a boy, general, and president; and a steel tapestry with an abstract depiction of Pointe du Hoc, a site of D-Day.
Federal Hall	Neoclassical building with doric columns and a statue of George Washington	New York; 40.707°N 74.010°W	August 11, 1955	0.45 acres (0.0018 km^{2})	This neoclassical building on Wall Street, originally the Port of New York Custom House, stands at the site of the first US Capitol building. The original Federal style building was the site of George Washington's inauguration, the 1st United States Congress, and previously the Congress of the Confederation.
Flight 93	White granite wall with engraved names	Pennsylvania; 40.055°N 78.901°W	September 10, 2011	2,319.96 acres (9.3885 km^{2})	The fourth airplane hijacked in the September 11, 2001, attacks, United Airlines Flight 93, crashed in a field in southwest Pennsylvania after the passengers fought back against the terrorists, preventing a further attack at the capital. The memorial on the site has a white granite wall engraved with the names of the 40 victims, a 93 ft-tall (28 m) Tower of Voices with 40 wind chimes, and a visitor center.
Fort Caroline	Corner of an earthen fort surrounded by a moat	Florida; 30.386°N 81.498°W	January 16, 1953	138.39 acres (0.5600 km^{2})	Around 200 French Huguenots founded Fort Caroline (named after King Charles IX) as a refuge in French Florida in 1685. A year later the Spanish founded St. Augustine nearby and attacked and massacred the settlers at Fort Caroline to take unified control of the region. The current site within the Timucuan Preserve has a reconstructed fort with hiking trails, a visitor center, and monument to the executed leader Jean Ribault.
Franklin Delano Roosevelt Memorial	Waterfalls flowing over stone blocks into a pool	District of Columbia; 38.883°N 77.043°W	May 2, 1997	8.14 acres (0.0329 km^{2})	Franklin D. Roosevelt was the United States' longest-serving president, leading the country during a period of enormous national challenges. Four sections of waterfalls and pools represent Roosevelt's terms in office, when he instituted the New Deal to modernize the economy during the Great Depression and unified the country during World War II. Bronze statues of Roosevelt, his wife Eleanor, his dog Fala, and scenes of period Americans stand between stone walls engraved with notable quotations.
General Grant	Neoclassical building with Doric columns and a rotunda	New York; 40.813°N 73.963°W	May 1, 1959	0.76 acres (0.0031 km^{2})	Ulysses S. Grant was general of the Union Army and led several victories in Civil War battles before forcing surrender of Lee's Confederacy. He served two terms as president of the United States, overseeing Reconstruction and civil rights, government reform, and relations with Native Americans. Grant's Tomb in Upper Manhattan is his and his wife's resting place, designed after the Mausoleum at Halicarnassus.
Hamilton Grange	Yellow house with a staircase to the front door and veranda on the side	New York; 40.821°N 73.947°W	November 19, 1988	1.04 acres (0.0042 km^{2})	Alexander Hamilton was a Founding Father who promoted adoption of the Constitution and served as the first Secretary of the Treasury to establish the nation's economic and political system. He lived in this mansion in Harlem for the last two years of his life before being killed in a duel, and his widow lived there for 29 more years. It has been relocated in the vicinity twice for preservation and restoration and now hosts tours.
Johnstown Flood	Black and white photo of a row of buildings with broken wood in front	Pennsylvania; 40.350°N 78.771°W	August 31, 1964	177.76 acres (0.7194 km^{2})	When the South Fork Dam catastrophically failed in 1889, the town of Johnstown, Pennsylvania, was flooded and more than 2,200 people died, making the flood now the third-deadliest event in the US. The memorial at the site of the dam remains features a visitor center, short hiking trails, and a historic clubhouse.
Korean War Veterans Memorial	Aerial view of the triangular memorial surrounded by trees	District of Columbia; 38.888°N 77.048°W	July 27, 1995	1.56 acres (0.0063 km^{2})	The US led United Nations forces in the Korean War from 1950 to 1953 defending South Korea against North Korea as part of the Cold War. Of the over 300,000 US servicemembers, more than 36,000 died in the war that ended in a stalemate. The memorial includes a black granite wall etched with images of soldiers, 19 statues of a platoon on patrol, and the Pool of Remembrance that reflects the surrounding linden trees.
Lincoln Boyhood	Log cabin in the woods	Indiana; 38.113°N 86.996°W	February 19, 1962	199.65 acres (0.8080 km^{2})	Abraham Lincoln moved with his family from Kentucky to forested Southern Indiana in 1816 and lived there from age 7 to 21. He worked on his family's farm and taught himself with little formal schooling during these formative years. His mother died and is buried here. A living museum reenacts a period farm at a reconstructed homestead near the original home's foundation and a sculpted limestone memorial building.
Lincoln Memorial	Aerial view of white memorial encircled by columns	District of Columbia; 38.889°N 77.050°W	May 30, 1922	7.29 acres (0.0295 km^{2})	Abraham Lincoln led the Union during the Civil War, bringing back together a divided nation and abolishing slavery before being assassinated shortly after the end of the war. A 30 ft-tall (9.1 m) statue of a seated Lincoln sits in this grand temple overlooking the National Mall toward the Capitol. Inside walls are inscribed with the text of his second inaugural address and the Gettysburg Address. Thirty-six Doric columns that represent the states of the Union in 1865 support an entablature whose frieze is inscribed with the names of the 48 states at the time of construction in 1922.
Lyndon Baines Johnson Memorial Grove on the Potomac	Triangular sandstone rock with Washington Monument in the background	District of Columbia; 38.877°N 77.050°W	September 27, 1974	17.00 acres (0.0688 km^{2})	Lyndon B. Johnson's presidency saw passage of Great Society legislation that expanded health care access through Medicare and Medicaid, established civil and voting rights prohibiting racial discrimination, addressed poverty and rural development, and promoted conservation and environmental protection. The grove of pine and dogwood trees surrounded by flowers sits on an island in the Potomac with trails, meadows, and a commemorative granite monolith.
Martin Luther King Jr. Memorial	White granite statue of Martin Luther King Jr.	District of Columbia; 38.886°N 77.044°W	August 28, 2011	2.74 acres (0.0111 km^{2})	Martin Luther King Jr. was the most significant leader of the Civil rights movement, organizing boycotts against segregated buses, solidarity marches for civil rights, and the March on Washington against inequality. He won the Nobel Peace Prize for nonviolent resistance but was assassinated in 1968. Notable quotations, including from his "I Have a Dream" speech and sermons, are etched on granite walls and a 30 ft (9.1 m) sculpture of King.
Mount Rushmore	Heads of four presidents carved into the mountain with blue sky	South Dakota; 43.879°N 103.459°W	July 1, 1939	1,278.45 acres (5.1737 km^{2})	Gutzon Borglum led the sculpting of Presidents George Washington, Thomas Jefferson, Theodore Roosevelt, and Abraham Lincoln into a mountain in the Black Hills. Limited funding resulted in carving only 60 ft (18 m) heads without their torsos. Mountain goats, mule deer, and yellow-bellied marmots are among the wildlife living in the hills near the visitor center and walking path.
Pearl Harbor	White Arizona memorial with downward sloped top and American flag	Hawaii; 21.36°N 157.95°W	March 12, 2019	21.30 acres (0.0862 km^{2})	The attack on Pearl Harbor on December 7, 1941, led to the entry of the United States into World War II. Japanese bombers in a surprise attack damaged 21 ships, killing 2,403 Americans. Only the USS Arizona, Oklahoma, and Utah were total losses, and their memorials are the centerpieces of this site that also includes Battleship Row and a visitor center with boat rides to the USS Arizona Memorial at the site of the wreck.
Perry's Victory and International Peace Memorial	Doric column-shaped tower with trees at its base	Ohio; 41.654°N 82.811°W	October 26, 1972	25.38 acres (0.1027 km^{2})	Commodore Oliver Hazard Perry's naval fleet defeated the British at the Battle of Lake Erie during the War of 1812, securing control of the lake and later peace with Britain and Canada. The world's largest Doric column, with an observation deck on top, stands 352 ft (107 m) tall on South Bass Island to commemorate the battle and international cooperation.
Port Chicago Naval Magazine	Reconstructed sloped fortification with a rail car inside	California; 38.056°N 122.030°W	October 28, 1992	5.00 acres (0.0202 km^{2})	In 1944, 430 tons of munition exploded while being loaded onto ships at the Port Chicago Naval Magazine, creating a three-mile-wide fireball that killed 320 people and seriously injured 390 more in the Port Chicago disaster. The majority of victims were Black, and a subsequent mutiny protesting unsafe conditions and segregation led to a court-martial of the mutineers and eventually integration of the armed forces.
Roger Williams		Rhode Island; 41.831°N 71.411°W	October 22, 1965	4.56 acres (0.0185 km^{2})	Roger Williams founded the colony of Rhode Island on the basis of religious freedom, having been exiled from the Massachusetts Bay Colony for separating from the Church of England. The memorial is a landscaped park in downtown Providence, with a visitor center in a historic home.
Thaddeus Kosciuszko	Red brick house with many windows at the corner of a block	Pennsylvania; 39.943°N 75.147°W	October 21, 1972	0.02 acres (0.0081 hectares)	Polish engineer Tadeusz Kościuszko joined the Continental Army when the American Revolution broke out, overseeing various fort construction projects and later leading troops on the battlefield. After returning to Poland and leading a failed uprising against Russian occupation, he briefly lived at this house in Philadelphia before returning to Europe again. This is the smallest unit of the National Park System.
Theodore Roosevelt Island	Statue of Roosevelt holding an arm up during an oration	District of Columbia; 38.897°N 77.064°W	October 27, 1967	88.50 acres (0.3581 km^{2})	Theodore Roosevelt led the Rough Riders during the Spanish–American War and served as governor of New York before becoming vice president and then president when William McKinley was assassinated. His Square Deal promoted trustbusting, labor rights, and consumer protection, and he was a noted conservationist, establishing the Forest Service, the first national monuments, and wildlife refuges. This forested island in the Potomac features hiking trails and a memorial plaza with fountains, notable quotations, and a 17 ft (5.2 m) statue of Roosevelt.
Thomas Jefferson Memorial	Round white memorial with columns and dome in front of the water	District of Columbia; 38.881°N 77.037°W	April 13, 1943	18.36 acres (0.0743 km^{2})	Thomas Jefferson was a Founding Father who wrote the Declaration of Independence, was the first secretary of state, and served as president from 1801 to 1809. He promoted democratic ideals, individual freedoms, and states' rights in his nationally formative writings, and as president he expanded the country's territory with the Louisiana Purchase. The memorial, based on the Pantheon and the Rotunda at the University of Virginia that Jefferson designed himself, sits on the Tidal Basin with a bronze statue facing toward the White House surrounded by notable quotations.
Vietnam Veterans Memorial	Wall of black granite engraved with names	District of Columbia; 38.891°N 77.048°W	November 13, 1982	2.18 acres (0.0088 km^{2})	Almost three million Americans were deployed to Vietnam during the Vietnam War from 1955 to 1975 as part of a campaign to stop communism in the region. Reflective black granite walls, sunken below ground level, bear the names of 58,320 servicemembers who died during the conflict. There are also statues representing women who served and the diversity of soldiers.
Washington Monument	Aerial view of the obelisk with the White House in the background	District of Columbia; 38.889°N 77.035°W	February 21, 1885	106.01 acres (0.4290 km^{2})	As commanding general of the Continental Army, George Washington was instrumental in securing victory in the Revolutionary War, leading him to serve as the first president of the United States. His presidency laid the foundations for the politics of the republic with policies on banking, taxes, the judiciary, and foreign affairs. The Monument, the centerpiece of the National Mall, is a 555 ft (169 m) tall obelisk of marble, granite, and gneiss topped with a small aluminum pyramid. A variety of interior memorial stones are visible from the elevator to the observation deck.
World War I Memorial	Pond with ducks and waterfall	District of Columbia; 38.896°N 77.033°W	December 19, 2014	1.76 acres (0.0071 km^{2})	The US entered World War I in 1917 and the American Expeditionary Forces saw about 2.8 million servicemembers fight in Europe through the end of the following year, with 53,000 deaths. Originally called Pershing Park in honor of General John J. Pershing, as of 2019 the memorial is undergoing a conversion from a fountain and pond to a lawn and plaza with a wall of remembrance.
World War II Memorial	Aerial view of oval-shaped memorial with pond and white walkways	District of Columbia; 38.889°N 77.040°W	May 29, 2004	8.25 acres (0.0334 km^{2})	Over 16 million veterans served during World War II from 1941 to 1945 alongside the other Allies against the Axis powers. The memorial recognizes their service with two triumphal arches representing the Atlantic and Pacific theaters, surrounded by 56 pillars for the states and territories. At the center is a pool with an oval of fountains, on the east are walls engraved with scenes of war, and on the west is a wall with 4,048 gold stars representing the approximately 404,800 killed in action.
Wright Brothers	Wing-shaped monument on a summy day	North Carolina; 36.014°N 75.668°W	December 4, 1953	428.44 acres (1.7338 km^{2})	Wilbur and Orville Wright made the first powered flight with the Wright Flyer at Kill Devil Hills near Kitty Hawk in 1903, developing it into the first fixed-wing aircraft, the Wright Flyer III. A monument tower representing a wing commemorates their achievement and earlier aviation experimenters. Paths outline the routes of the first flights near a reproduction hangar.

== Affiliated areas of National Park Service ==
The National Park Service provides technical or financial assistance to affiliated areas but does not own or administer them.

Name	Image	Location	Date established	Area	Description
American Memorial Park	Grassy field leading up to a terraced site with five flags	Northern Mariana Islands; 15.216°N 145.722°E	August 18, 1978	133.00 acres (0.5 km^{2})	The Japanese had mandate over the Northern Mariana Islands after World War I and used them as a base for their World War II Pacific offensive. The key summer 1944 Battles of Saipan and Tinian during the Mariana Islands campaign led to the US liberation of the islands. The Commonwealth-owned memorial commemorates the thousands of American and Chamorro casualties during the campaign with a flag monument, bell tower, and granite memorial near recreational park areas and a mangrove forest.
Benjamin Franklin	Seated statue of Benjamin Franklin in white marble	Pennsylvania; 39.958°N 75.173°W	October 25, 1972	0.154 acres (0.1 hectares)	Benjamin Franklin was a Founding Father who served in several political and diplomatic roles during the early republic, signing both the Declaration of Independence and the Constitution. He made a number of scientific inquiries and inventions including the lightning rod, bifocals, and the Franklin stove. The 20 ft (6.1 m) marble statue of a seated Franklin by James Earle Fraser sits in the Memorial Hall rotunda of the Franklin Institute in Philadelphia.
Father Marquette	Small round open structure with spire at center	Michigan; 45.853°N 84.726°W	December 20, 1975	52.00 acres (0.2 km^{2})	The French Jesuit missionary Jacques Marquette founded the first two European settlements in Michigan, Sault Ste. Marie and St. Ignace, seeking to convert Native Americans to Catholicism. He joined Louis Jolliet on an exploration of the Upper Mississippi River. A memorial and interpretive trail in Straits State Park overlook the Mackinac Bridge.
Oklahoma City	Long reflecting pond lined with trees and walkways	Oklahoma; 35.473°N 97.517°W	April 19, 2000	6.24 acres (0.0 km^{2})	Anti-government terrorists detonated a truck bomb that destroyed the Alfred P. Murrah Federal Building, killing 168 people, injuring another 680, and damaging hundreds of buildings. The memorial features a reflecting pool flanked by square bronze gates that represent the moments before and after the event at 9:01 am on April 19, 1995. A field of empty chairs and what is left of the building's walls symbolize the victims and survivors, mostly federal employees and children at a day care.
Red Hill Patrick Henry	Small cottage with white walls, black door, and brick chimney	Virginia; 37.032°N 78.898°W	May 12, 1986	1,000 acres (4.0 km^{2})	Patrick Henry was the first governor of Virginia and was known for his oration for the cause of independence from Britain, including his 1775 "Give me liberty or give me death!" speech. He lived at his Red Hill estate the last five years of his life, which now has the original law office and reconstructed home.

== Other national memorials ==
Congress has designated a number of sites as national memorials but not as official units or affiliated areas of the National Park Service. While some are maintained by other federal agencies, most of these were created by local governments or private organizations which sought federal designation for wider and official recognition; the naming typically does not come with federal funding, but Congress has provided funds or allowed private fundraising for certain memorial sites. The Department of the Interior has noted that Congressional designation of private or local government sites as "National" may mislead the public into believing they are affiliated with the federal government. Congress has also authorized the construction of many memorials or commemorative works on federal land under the Commemorative Works Act, usually in Washington, D.C., or nearby; these are not listed in this table unless specifically called a national memorial.

Name	Image	Location	Date designated	Agency	Description
AIDS Memorial Grove	Landscaped woods with stone wall in background	California 37.77°N 122.46°W	November 12, 1996	Private	This seven-acre (0.028 km^{2}) landscaped space in San Francisco's Golden Gate Park features redwood trees, meadows, and memorial spaces dedicated to victims and patients of HIV/AIDS and the continued fight against the disease.
Astronauts Memorial	Large square black wall with people standing in front	Florida 28.525°N 80.682°W	May 8, 1991	NASA	The Space Mirror Memorial at NASA's Kennedy Space Center is a reflective black granite monument engraved with the names of 24 astronauts who have died in spaceflight missions or training. Major disasters include Apollo 1 and Space Shuttles Challenger and Columbia.
Battle of Midway	Memorial signs with nesting albatrosses and a statue of a large albatross	Midway Atoll 28.20°N 177.35°W	September 13, 2000		The Battle of Midway in June 1942 was the turning point of the Pacific War that put the US Navy on the offensive. The victory cost the lives of 307 sailors, a destroyer, and an aircraft carrier, but secured the vital base on the island and weakened the Japanese position. The Fish and Wildlife Service maintains a memorial park at the dual-named Midway Atoll National Wildlife Refuge and Battle of Midway National Memorial, a breeding ground for albatross, Hawaiian monk seals, and other marine life.
David Berger Memorial	Sculpture of connected semicircles atop a round base	Ohio 41.474°N 81.492°W	March 5, 1980		David Berger was an American Israeli weightlifter who competed at the 1972 Summer Olympics. He and ten other Israeli competitors and coaches were kidnapped and killed by terrorists in the Munich massacre. Located at a Jewish Community Center, a steel sculpture of the five Olympic rings split in half sits on eleven supporting segments.
El Paso Community Healing Garden	–	Texas 31.757°N 106.401°W	December 29, 2022		A right-wing terrorist targeted Latino Americans at a Walmart store in El Paso, killing 23 people and injuring 22 in a mass shooting. A memorial to these victims of white supremacy and gun violence consisting of 23 bronze plaques on a semicircular wall was installed at Ascarate Park in the Mission Valley neighborhood in August 2021.
National D-Day Memorial	Tall arch in background, pool with statues of soldiers in foreground	Virginia 37.33°N 79.53°W	June 6, 2001		American troops joined Allied forces in the Invasion of Normandy on D-Day, June 6, 1944, to begin the liberation of France. More than 150,000 Allied troops landed in a sustained airborne and amphibious assault on five beaches that saw more than 10,000 casualties. The memorial includes a central pool, Operation Overlord arch, numerous statues of commandos in action and General Eisenhower, and flags of participating nations.
Disabled American Veterans Vietnam Veterans	Lighted chapel exterior at dusk	New Mexico 36.441°N 105.295°W	November 13, 1987		The parents of a soldier killed in Vietnam built a sail-shaped chapel with the assistance of Disabled American Veterans to honor all veterans of the war. The site, a New Mexico Department of Veteran Services memorial, also has a helicopter damaged in Vietnam and sculptures of a soldier and nurses.
Distinguished Flying Cross	–	California 33.883°N 117.267°W	July 25, 2014		The Distinguished Flying Cross has been awarded to more than 170,000 members of the US armed forces and some civilians who have shown "heroism or extraordinary achievement while participating in an aerial flight". The March Field Air Museum hosts this pyramidal monument in honor of their service.
National Memorial to Fallen Educators	Small memorial of black granite with a one-room schoolhouse in background	Kansas 38.420°N 96.181°W	April 30, 2018		Located at the National Teachers Hall of Fame, this monument honors educators who died in the course of their roles, including victims of school shootings and school bus crashes.
National Fallen Firefighters Memorial	Circular plaza with sculpture of a cross in the center and plaques on the outside	Maryland 39.395°N 77.326°W	August 9, 1990	FEMA	On the campus of the National Fire Academy, a sculpted St. Florian cross and eternal flame are surrounded by a Wall of Honor with the names of firefighters who died in the line of duty. It is maintained by the National Fallen Firefighters Foundation.
Japanese American Memorial to Patriotism During World War II		District of Columbia 38.895°N 77.010°W	November 9, 2000		The US government baselessly challenged the loyalty of 120,000 Japanese Americans during World War II, unconstitutionally detaining them in a number of concentration camps around the country. Despite that, 33,000 Japanese Americans served their country in the armed forces. This monument depicting cranes escaping barbed wire symbolizes their sacrifices during this injustice. It is part of the National Mall and Memorial Parks NPS unit.
Kol Israel Foundation Holocaust Memorial		Ohio 41.411°N 81.526°W	December 29, 2022		The Zion Memorial Park Cemetery donated land for the construction of a monument to victims of the Holocaust in 1961, the first in the United States. A ring of granite is engraved with names of 1,300 family members of Cleveland-area Holocaust survivors. It surrounds a central column that contains ashes of victims.
National Law Enforcement Officers Memorial	Short white walls with an adult lion sculpture sitting on the left and a lion cub on the right	District of Columbia 38.90°N 77.02°W	October 15, 1991		Honoring more than 23,000 law enforcement officers who have died in the line of duty, the memorial plaza has tree-lined pathways protected by twelve bronze lions.
Medicine Creek Treaty	Tree stump next to a small creek	Washington 47.07°N 122.71°W	December 18, 2015		The 1854 Treaty of Medicine Creek established three reservations for nine south Puget Sound-area tribes, who ceded 2,240,000 acres (9,100 km^{2}) to the US government; agreed-upon payments and hunting and fishing rights however were not respected, leading to further conflict. The signing site is managed by the Fish and Wildlife Service in the Billy Frank Jr. Nisqually National Wildlife Refuge, named for a Nisqually activist who successfully fought for the treaty rights.
Mt. Soledad Veterans Memorial	White cross on top of a hill and American flag	California 32.840°N 117.245°W	December 8, 2004		A wooden cross was originally placed on Mount Soledad in San Diego by local residents in 1913. The current 29 ft-tall (8.8 m) concrete cross was built in 1954 by Christian groups and was designated a memorial to veterans in 1989. The Department of Defense took the site from the city by eminent domain in 2006 until it was sold to a private association in 2015 following a three-decade-long Establishment Clause legal battle. Six walls are covered in plaques commemorating veterans and military units.
National Native American Veterans Memorial		District of Columbia; 38.889°N 77.016°W	November 11, 2020		This memorial at the National Museum of the American Indian honors the military service of American Indian, Alaska Native, and Native Hawaiian veterans. A vertical steel circle stands on a stone drum from which water flows and a ceremonial fire burns.
National Pulse Memorial		Florida; 28.520°N 81.377°W	June 25, 2021		Pulse, a gay nightclub in Orlando, Florida, was the scene of a mass shooting that killed 49 people on June 12, 2016. There are plans for a permanent memorial with a reflecting pool at the site.
National Veterans Memorial and Museum	Aerial view of round white museum with grassy roof and grounds	Ohio 39.96°N 83.01°W	October 27, 2018		This is the first museum dedicated to veterans and their families, focusing on their individual stories and sacrifices rather than the military and war. Exhibits show servicemembers' journeys throughout American history and how veterans are recognized in society. An elm-lined memorial grove with waterfalls into a reflecting pool offers space for remembrance.
Prisoner of War/Missing in Action	Statue of soldier bound on his knees surrounded by granite panels	California 33.887°N 117.278°W	December 10, 2004	National Cemetery Administration	This memorial at Riverside National Cemetery (US Department of Veterans Affairs) depicts a man on his knees and bound by his captors, surrounded by pillars of black marble. It commemorates American servicemembers who have been taken prisoner of war or went missing in action.
United States Marine Corps War Memorial	Sculpture of five Marines erecting an American flag	Virginia 38.89°N 77.07°W	November 10, 1954	NPS	This memorial is dedicated to the dead of the US Marine Corps since its founding in 1775. Located at George Washington Memorial Parkway it depicts the raising of the flag on Iwo Jima, a symbol of the Corps's dedication in amphibious warfare.
USS Indianapolis Memorial	Small stone memorial in the shape of a ship depicting a ship with flags in the background	Indiana 39.777°N 86.165°W	November 30, 1993		The heavy cruiser USS Indianapolis was torpedoed by a submarine after it delivered parts of the Little Boy atomic bomb to Tinian, killing 300 sailors when it sank. Another 600 perished during four days adrift and only 316 survived, making it the US Navy's greatest loss of life at sea due to its failure to monitor the ship's movement. The granite memorial resembles the shape of a ship and depicts the Indianapolis with the names of the crew.
White Cross World War I Memorial	Rocky outcropping with a cross on top, tree and sign in foreground	California 35.315°N 115.550°W	January 10, 2002	NPS	A white cross was originally erected by Veterans of Foreign Wars (VFW) in the Mojave Desert in 1934 as a memorial to American participation in World War I and those who served. Previously in Mojave National Preserve, the land around the cross was conveyed to the VFW due to separation of church and state concerns, the constitutionality of which transfer was upheld by the Supreme Court in 2010.

== National commemorative sites ==
Congress has designated certain places as "National Commemorative Sites" in remembrance of important events that have taken place there. For these national commemorative sites, Congress has authorized some types of federal involvement, such as establishment of a commemorative monument and interpretive exhibit, or cooperative agreements under which the NPS may provide technical assistance in protecting a site's historic resources or providing educational and interpretive programs. However, the sites are not considered official units of the National Park System and are nonfederally owned and administered. Congress has designated the following national commemorative sites:

Name	Image	Location	Date designated	Description
Charleston		Charleston, AR	21 October 1998	It recognizes the first public school district in the former Confederacy to integrate following the 1954 U.S. Supreme Court decision in Brown v. Board of Education.
Kennedy-King		Indianapolis, IN	4 April 2018	It commemorates where Robert Kennedy spoke on the day that Reverend Martin Luther King Jr. was assassinated in 1968.
Quindaro Townsite		Kansas City, KS	12 March 2019	It commemorates abolitionism in Kansas in the 1850s and the Underground Railroad.
Holcombe Rucker Park		Manhattan, NY	4 January 2025	It recognizes the historic role of this city park in the development of basketball.
Jackie Robinson Ballpark		Daytona Beach, FL	4 January 2025	It commemorates where Jackie Robinson played in the first racially integrated spring training game of major-league baseball.

== Future national memorials ==
These memorials have been authorized by Congress but have not yet been constructed and established. Three would become NPS units if completed.

Name	Location	Date authorized	Description
Hershel Woody Williams National Medal of Honor Monument	District of Columbia	December 27, 2021	Will honor recipients of the Medal of Honor. Named after Hershel W. Williams. There is a 2028 deadline to raise funds and finalize a design for the memorial.
National Emergency Medical Services Memorial	District of Columbia	November 3, 2018	Will honor the services of emergency medical services personnel. There is a 2033 deadline to raise funds and finalize a design for the memorial.
National Global War on Terrorism Memorial	District of Columbia	August 18, 2017	Will commemorate the events and veterans of the war on terror, including the Iraq War and War in Afghanistan and other military campaigns. There is a 2028 deadline to raise funds and finalize a design for the memorial, which received an exemption to be built in the Reserve.
Women's Suffrage National Monument	District of Columbia	December 17, 2020	Will honor suffragists who organized and demonstrated for the women's right to vote in the United States. There is a 2027 deadline to raise funds and finalize a design for the memorial.

== See also ==
- List of areas in the United States National Park System
- List of national monuments of the United States
- Presidential memorials in the United States
- National Capital Memorial Advisory Commission
