= Peace Corps Commemorative =

The Peace Corps Commemorative is a proposed national commemorative work in Washington, D.C. honoring the historic founding of the Peace Corps and the enduring American ideals that motivated its founding and are expressed in Peace Corps service. The Peace Corps is a volunteer-sending program run by the United States government. Congress authorized the Peace Corps Commemorative in January 2014.

== Background ==
The Peace Corps program was established by Executive Order 10924, which was issued by President John F. Kennedy on March 1, 1961. The program was legislatively authorized by Congress on September 21, 1961, with passage of the Peace Corps Act (Pub.L. 87–293). Between 1961 and 2013, over 215,000 Americans joined the Peace Corps. The National Peace Corps Association, a nonprofit organization for Peace Corps alumni, established the Peace Corps Commemorative Foundation to advocate for a commemorative to honor the mission of the Peace Corps and the values on which it was founded.

=== Previous legislative efforts ===
Legislation to establish a Peace Corps commemorative was first introduced in the United States House of Representatives by Representative Sam Farr (D-California), a former Peace Corps volunteer, on December 3, 2009. Although the legislation passed the House, it was never adopted in the United States Senate and died at the end of the 111th United States Congress on December 22, 2010.

On March 1, 2011, Farr introduced H.R.854, essentially the same legislation, in the House of Representatives. The bill never made it out of committee. In the Senate, Senator Rob Portman (R-Ohio) introduced S.1421, companion legislation lacking the "findings of Congress" statement in the House bill. S.1421 passed the Senate on December 30, 2012, but was never acted on by the House. It died at the end of the 112th United States Congress on January 3, 2013.

=== Successful legislative effort ===
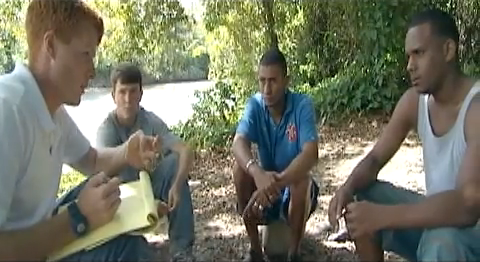
Future Representative Joseph P. Kennedy III working as a Peace Corps Volunteer in the Dominican Republic in 2009. Kennedy sponsored the legislation establishing a Peace Corps Commemorativel in the House.

Under the Commemorative Works Act of 1986, new memorials and monuments were banned on federal lands within the Washington, D.C., metropolitan region unless they received congressional authorization and passed through a lengthy and stringent site, design, and construction approval process. In early 2013, Ohio Governor Bob Taft (R), a former Peace Corps volunteer, asked Senator Portman to again sponsor legislation authorizing a Peace Corps Commemorative. The legislation, S.230, was co-sponsored by Senator Mark Udall (D-Colorado) and introduced into the Senate on February 7, 2013. It was favorably reported by the Senate Committee on Energy and Natural Resources on April 22, 2013, and adopted with unanimous consent by the Senate on June 19, 2013.

Companion legislation was introduced in the House of Representatives on February 28, 2013, by Representative Joseph P. Kennedy III (D-Massachusetts), a former Peace Corps volunteer and grand-nephew of President Kennedy. It was the first congressional bill sponsored by Kennedy. The legislation (H.R.915) was co-sponsored by Representatives Farr, Tom Petri (R-Wisconsin), Mike Honda (D-California), and John Garamendi (D-California)—all former Peace Corps volunteers. It was favorably reported by the House Committee on Natural Resources and the House Committee on the Budget on January 23, 2104.

H.R.915 differed from S.230 only in including a 10-point section on the "findings of Congress". To ensure swift passage of the legislation, the House moved to adopt the Senate bill rather than reconcile the two pieces of legislation in a conference committee. S.230 was approved by the House, 387-to-7, on January 13, 2014. President Barack Obama signed the legislation into law on January 24, 2014 (Public Law 113-78).

=== Final legislation ===
P.L. 113-78 is titled "Memorial to Commemorate America's Commitment to International Service and Global Prosperity". Section 1 of the Act authorizes the Peace Corps Commemorative Foundation to oversee the commemorative's design and construction, and allows it to be built on federally owned land in the District of Columbia and nearby areas. The memorial shall "commemorate the mission of the Peace Corps and the ideals on which the Peace Corps was founded." Section 1 also requires the commemorative work to be established under the procedures of the Commemorative Works Act. No federal funds may be used to design or build the commemorative (a requirement imposed on all monuments, memorials, and statues since the mid-20th century), and the Peace Corps Commemorative Foundation is authorized to solicit contributions for the cost of design and construction of the commemorative. (Excess funds are to be deposited with the United States Treasury.) Section 2 of the Act required the legislation to comply with the Statutory Pay-As-You-Go Act of 2010.

== Siting and design ==
Under the procedures established by the Commemorative Works Act (as amended), the site for any monument, memorial, or statue to be built on federal land in the D.C. region must be approved by the National Capital Memorial Advisory Commission (NCMAC). On May 6, 2014, the Peace Corps Commemorative Foundation (PCCF) submitted a preliminary site report to the NCMAC. The PCCF argued that the monument must be close to the "monumental core" (National Mall and its immediate environs) of Washington, D.C. It evaluated 16 different empty sites near the monumental core, and rejected 12 of them as being too distant from other monuments and memorials. It short-listed four sites:

- A trapezoidal site at the eastern edge of Georgetown bounded by Rock Creek Park, Pennsylvania Avenue NW, 26th Street NW, and M Street NW.
- Two triangular sites bounded by H Street NW, 18th Street NW, and 19th Street NW. Pennsylvania Avenue NW runs northwest through the area, defining the two sites. These sites are north of the headquarters of the World Bank, and the northeastern site is currently Edward R. Murrow Park.
- A triangular site bounded by Louisiana Avenue NW, 1st Street NW, and C Street NW. This site is adjacent to Upper Senate Park, and is a half-block southwest of the Memorial to Japanese-American Patriotism in World War II. It is currently Vincent R. Sombrotto Memorial Park.

The PCCF asked the NCMAC to approve the Louisiana Avenue site.

In November 2014, the National Park Service recommended that the National Capital Planning Commission (NCPC) approve the Louisiana Avenue site for the commemorative. Although the smallest site (less than a quarter of an acre), it scored the highest on a Park Service ranking. The site was opposed by Advisory Neighborhood Commission 6C, which cited the loss of green space. The recommendation was submitted for the NCPC's December 2014 meeting.

Since 2015, the Peace Corps Commemorative Foundation has solicited, received and reviewed hundreds of design concept proposals for the Louisiana Avenue site. Many competing architects, landscape architects, and artists have been given detailed briefs and RFPs describing the aesthetic and interpretive goals for this commemorative work, as well as site information. A definitive specific design approach was developed by the PCCF design team for federal agency reviews and approvals in 2019–2020. On September 17, 2020, the U.S. Commission of Fine Arts unanimously approved the proposed design concept.
