= Afghan–Iraqi Freedom Memorial =

Fountain and war memorial in Salem, Oregon, U.S.

Coordinates: 44.9453°N 123.02666°W

- United States
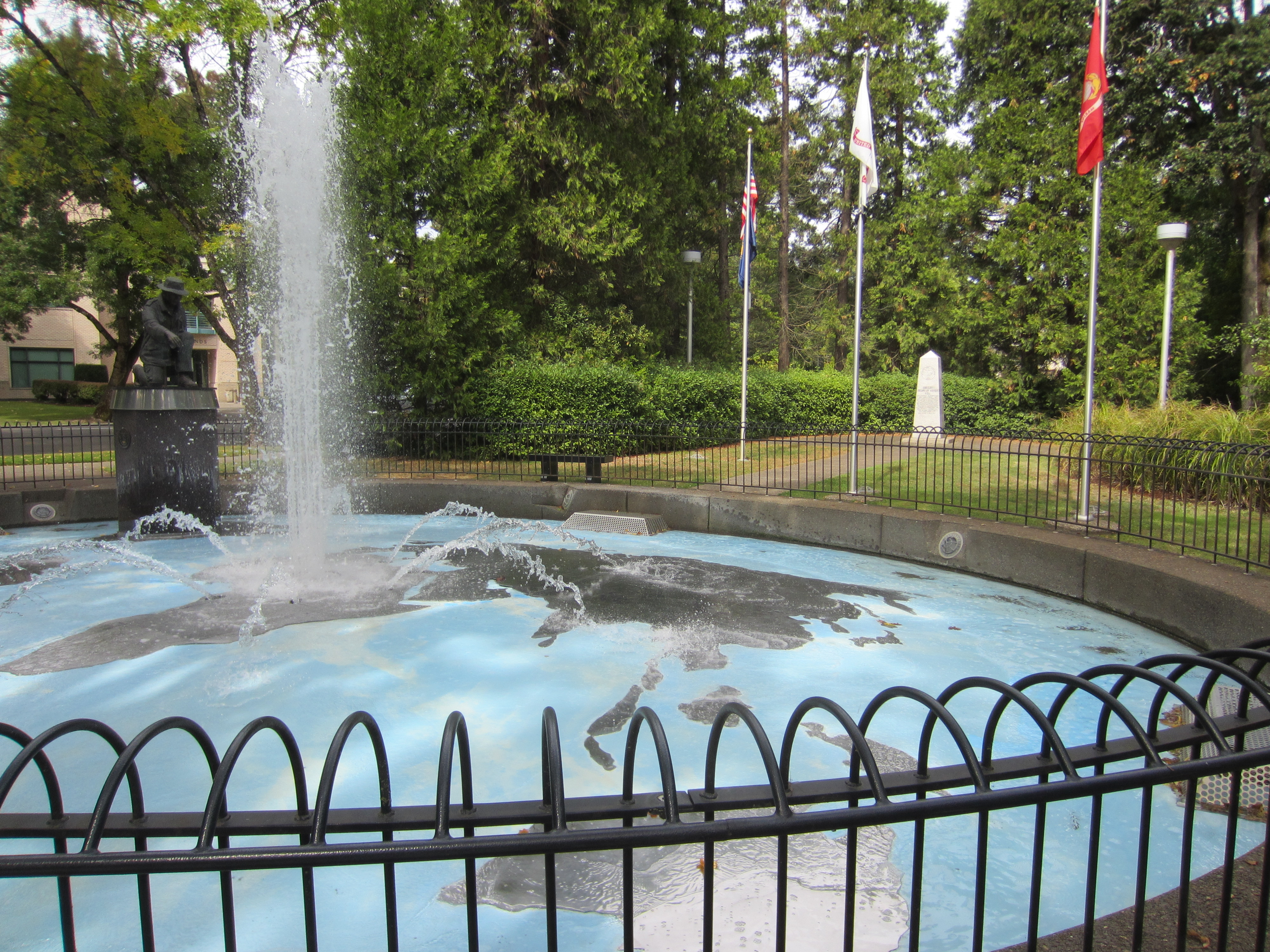
- The memorial in 2018
- For casualties of the Afghanistan and Iraq war
- Unveiled: 2006
- Location: Salem, Oregon, U.S.
- Designed by: Jane Honbeck

The Afghan–Iraqi Freedom Memorial is a war memorial installed on the Oregon Veterans' Building grounds, in Salem, Oregon, United States, honoring Oregon service members who died in the Iraq War and War in Afghanistan. The monument was dedicated in November 2006, making it one of the first state memorials specifically commemorating casualties from these contemporary conflicts.

== See also ==
- 2006 in art
