= Commemorative Works Act =

Federal law regulating memorials in Washington, D.C., areas

Commemorative Works Act of 1986
- 99th United States Congress

Congress
- Citation: PL 99-652; 40 United States Code 89, Sections 8901 to 8909
- Enacted by: Congress
- Enacted: October 16, 1986
- Signed: November 14, 1986

Legislative history
- Bill title: H.R. 4378; S. 2522
- Introduced by: Mo Udall
- Introduced: May 5, 1986
- Committee report: H.Rept. No. 99-574 (Interior and Insular Affairs); S.Rept. No. 99-421 (Energy and Natural Resources)

Summary
- To provide standards for placement of commemorative works on certain Federal lands in the District of Columbia and its environs, and for other purposes

The Commemorative Works Act of 1986 (Pub. L. 99–652; 40 U.S.C. ch. 89) (CWA) is a United States federal law which bars the construction of commemorative works near the National Mall and on federal land in the National Capital Area unless they are approved by the National Capital Memorial Advisory Commission (NCMAC). The law also establishes criteria a memorial must meet in order to be approved the NCMAC, and establishes a seven-year deadline by which construction must begin or the memorial loses its congressional authorization. As of April 2014, the law has been amended five times, most notably by the Commemorative Works Clarification and Revision Act of 2003.

== Commemorative Works Act of 1986 ==
=== Legislative history ===
By 1986, there were 110 national monuments, memorials, and statues in Washington, D.C., and its immediate environs. The pressure to build more memorials on the National Mall was extremely heavy, with roughly 15 new proposals being introduced in each session of Congress. Approximately 25 additional memorials had been seriously proposed but lacked a congressional sponsor to introduced authorizing legislation in Congress. The sheer number of memorials being proposed was not the only problem. The memorials were increasingly large, and often included extensive exhibits that threatened to turn memorials into miniature museums.

On March 11, 1986, Representative Mo Udall (D-Arizona) introduced H.R. 4378, the Commemorative Works Act of 1986, in the United States House of Representatives. The bill was favorably reported by the House Committee on Interior and Insular Affairs on April 23, and passed the House by voice vote on May 5. A companion bill, S. 2522, was introduced in the United States Senate by Senator Malcolm Wallop (R-Wyoming) on June 5. The bill was assigned to the Senate Committee on Energy and Natural Resources, which favorably reported the bill with amendments on August 15. The bill passed the Senate, with additional amendments, by voice vote on September 10. The House made additional amendments of its own, and concurred with the Senate bill by voice vote on September 29. The Senate concurred with the House-amended bill by voice vote on October 16. President Ronald Reagan signed the bill into law on November 14, 1986.

The Commemorative Works Act established "significant procedural roadblocks" to the creation of new memorials.

=== Provisions ===
Section 2(c) of the Commemorative Works Act of 1986 defines a "commemorative work" as a garden, memorial, memorial grove, monument, sculpture, statue, or other structure or landscape feature designed to perpetuate the memory of a person, group, or event.

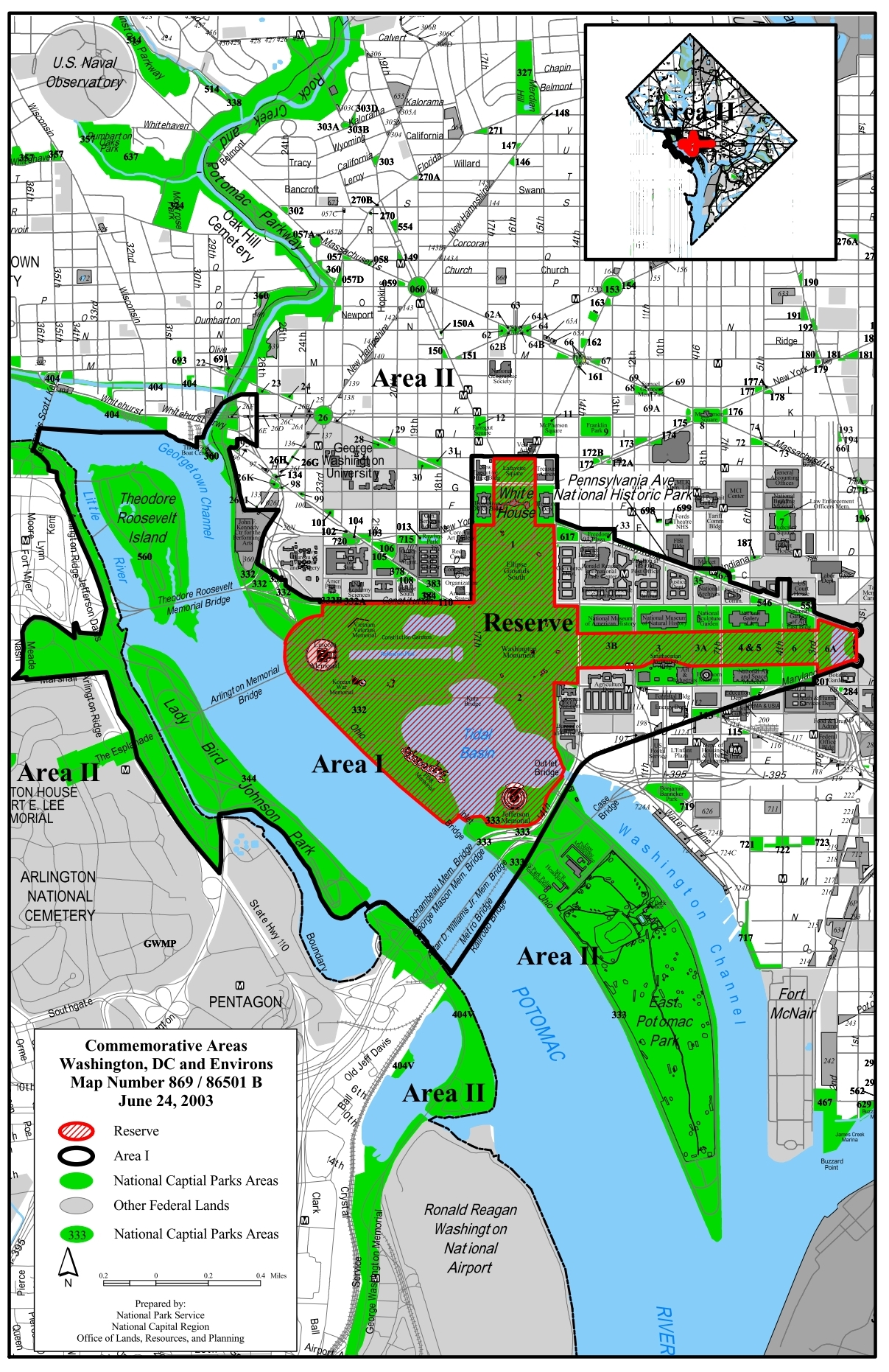
Map showing the Reserve (greyed out area), Area I (within black boundary) and Area II of the National Capital Area.

Section 2(e) established specific zones within the National Capital Region to which various rules established by the Act would apply. Working with the General Services Administration and the National Park Service, Congress had on May 1, 1986, created a map (number 869/86501) of these areas, which it named Area I and Area II. Area I roughly encompassed a zone extending from the White House to the United States Capitol; from the Capitol along Maryland Avenue SW to and along the 14th Street Bridge; the Virginia shore of the Potomac River from the 14th Street Bridge to Columbia Island; Columbia Island; the National Park Service land fronting Arlington National Cemetery (excluding Memorial Drive) north to Key Bridge; Key Bridge due east across the Potomac River to Rock Creek; Rock Creek north to 26th Street NW and L Street NW; south on 26th Street NW to I Street NW; roughly west from the intersection of I and 26th Streets NW to the National Park Service land on the D.C. shore of the Potomac River; south along the Potomac River to West Potomac Park (including the grounds of the John F. Kennedy Center for the Performing Arts); east along the National Mall to the Ellipse; and north to the White House. Area II consisted of those parts of the National Capital Area outside Area I.

Section 3(a) of the Act barred establishment of a memorial anywhere within Area I or Area II without specific authorization by Congress.

Section 4(a) of the Act formally established the National Capital Memorial Advisory Committee (NCMAC). This committee had been informally established earlier by the United States Department of the Interior. The Act charged NCMAC with administering the Commemorative Works Act, and specified the membership of the committee. These were:

- Director of the National Park Service (who was also designated the committee's chair)
- Architect of the Capitol
- Chair of the American Battle Monuments Commission
- Chair of the United States Commission of Fine Arts
- Chair of the National Capital Planning Commission
- Mayor of the District of Columbia
- Commissioner of the Public Building Service of the General Services Administration
- United States Secretary of Defense

Section 7(a)(1) required memorials to be submitted to NCMAC for siting approval. Section 7(a)(1) required memorials to be submitted to the Commission of Fine Arts and the National Capital Planning Commission for both site and design approval.

Section 6(a) of the Commemorative Works Act established the criteria a commemorative work had to meet to be erected in Area I. Either the United States Secretary of the Interior or the Administrator of the General Services Administration could approve a memorial within Area I if and only if the person, group, or event to be commemorated was of "preeminent historical and lasting significance to the Nation." This determination could be made only after consulting with NCMAC. Even so, the affirmative determination had to be approved by Congress within 150 days, or it was considered disapproved.

Section 6(b) of the Commemorative Works Act established the criteria a commemorative work had to meet to be erected in Area II. Section 6(b)(1) governed military commemorative works. It barred memorials for "lesser" conflicts and those commemorating only a unit of the armed forces of the United States. An individual or the last surviving member of a group to be commemorated had to have died at least 25 years ago for a memorial to be erected. Other commemorative works—those not commemorating a war, branch of the armed forces, individual, or group—were permissible in Area II only if they were "a subject of lasting historical significance."

Section 8(a) barred the District of Columbia or Department of the Interior from issuing a construction permit for a commemorative work unless its site and design had been approved by the secretary or administrator, the Commission of Fine Arts, and the National Capital Planning Commission; unless the memorial planners could prove they had consulted knowledgeable individuals regarding historic preservation and "structural soundness and durability" about the memorial design; the memorial's builder had design and construction contracts signed; and the memorial's builder had sufficient funds in hand to complete construction. (Note: Throughout American history, funding for federal memorials had traditionally come from private donors. The federal government rarely provided public financing.)

Section 8(b) also required memorial builders to collect an amount equal to 10 percent of the total cost of construction. This amount was to be turned over to the United States Treasury, which would hold them in trust as a perpetual operations and maintenance fund for the memorial.

Section 10(b) provided that the authorization for a memorial would expire at the end of five years, unless a construction permit had been issued by the Department of the Interior or the General Services Administration or Congress had expressly enacted legislation authorizing an extension of the deadline. Section 10(e) exempted any memorial authorized before the 99th Congress from the five-year deadline.

Section 10(c) of the Act required that title to completed commemorative works be transferred to the Department of the Interior or the General Services Administration upon completion.

== 1991 amendments ==
The 102nd Congress amended the Commemorative Works Act for the first time. Representative Bill Clay (D-Missouri) introduced H.R. 3169 on August 1, 1991. It was referred to the House Committee on Interior and Insular Affairs, which approved an amended bill on October 21. The House approved the bill by voice vote the same day. The bill was passed to the Senate, and referred to the Senate Committee on Energy and Natural Resources. It was reported favorably on November 12, and approved by the Senate in a voice vote on November 27. President George H. W. Bush signed it into law on December 11, 1991 (Pub. L. 102–216).

Public Law 102-216 lengthened the term of memorial authorization to seven years from five years.

== 1994 amendments ==
In 1994, Congress enacted amendments to the Commemorative Works Act (Pub. L. 103–321).

On August 6, 1993, Representative Nancy Johnson (R-Connecticut) introduced H.R. 2947. It was referred to the House Committee on Natural Resources and reported favorably on November 20, 1993. It passed the House on a voice vote on November 23. On October 15, 1993, Senator John Warner (R-Virginia) introduced companion legislation (S. 1552) in the Senate. It was referred to the Committee on Energy and Natural Resources, which favorably reported it on April 5, 1994. It passed the Senate on a voice vote on April 12. The House voted 378-to-0 to accept the amendment Senate bill on August 16, 1994. President Bill Clinton signed the bill into law on August 26.

Several memorials were close to losing their congressional authorization in 1994. The backers of these memorials convinced Congress that they were close to raising enough funds to build their commemorative works and obtain final design approval. In Section 1 of the amendments, Congress extended the authorization for the Black Revolutionary War Patriots Memorial, National Peace Garden, and Women in Military Service for America Memorial from seven years to 10 years.

Section 2(a) of the amendment made minor revisions to the commemorative works encompassed by the CWA. Commemorative works now included plaques and inscriptions, and memorial sponsors had to be either a public agency or a nonprofit organization as defined by the Internal Revenue Code.

Section 2(b)(2) added the requirement that a major conflict occur at least 10 years ago in order to be authorized in Area I.

Section 2(c) changed the requirements for meeting the construction deadline. Instead of commencing construction by the deadline, memorial backers now merely had to request a construction permit by the deadline. Memorial backers were also now required to show that they had considered alternative sites and alternative designs for their memorial as well.

Section 2(e)(2) established a new section of the CWA. It allowed the Secretary of the Interior or the Administrator of the General Services Administration (GSA) to suspend the fundraising for or construction of a commemorative work if the fundraising efforts misrepresented what the funds were being raised for, or if the fundraising effort implied it was an official effort of the United States government. Annual reports regarding fundraising were now required to be submitted either to Interior or GSA.

== 2002 amendments ==
On August 21, 2002, Congress enacted a law entitled "Codifying Title 40, United States Code—Public Buildings, Property, and Works" (Public Law 107–217). Subtitle II-Public Buildings and Works, Part D-Public Buildings, Grounds, and Parks in the District of Columbia, Sections 8901 to 8909 further amended the Commemorative Works Act.

Section 8902(a)(1) included "landscape features" in the definition of commemorative works. Section 8902(a)(2) expanded the range of organizations which could build memorials to any organization authorized by Congress (regardless of its nonprofit or for-profit status). Section 8903(b) now barred absolutely works commemorating lesser conflicts or units of the armed forces.

Because the National Capital Memorial Advisory Committee was a creation of the Department of the Interior, it could be dissolved by the department at will, which would leave the CWA without an enforcing body. To rectify this, Section 8904 established a new National Capital Memorial Commission. It had the same membership, chair, and authority as its predecessor.

Part D also made changes to the procedures by which memorials would be considered. Now it was mandatory under Section 8905(a)(1) for a memorial's backers to consult with the National Capital Memorial Commission (NCMC) regarding alternative sites and designs. No longer could memorial backers submit their proposed sites and designs directly to the CFA or the NCPC. Now, according to Section 8905(a)(2), only the Department of the Interior or GSA had that authority (which effectively forced memorial backers to coordinate with them to get a submission made).

Congress also tightened the rules for approving a memorial. Section 8905(b) now required that the work be placed only in an area "relevant to the subject of the work"; that the new memorial not "interfere with, or encroach on, an existing commemorative work"; protect as much open space as possible and be compatible with existing public use; be constructed of durable materials; and contain landscaping compatible with the local climate.

Section 8906(b)(1) now required that the 10 percent trust fund be turned over to the Treasury before a construction permit could be issued.

== 2003 amendments ==
Congress enacted the Vietnam Veterans Memorial Visitor Center Authorization (Public Law 108–126) on November 17, 2003. Unlike subsequent memorial nonprofits, the Vietnam Veterans Memorial Foundation (VVMF) continued to operate and solicit funds long after the Vietnam Veterans Memorial had been constructed. The foundation was now self-perpetuating, and had a large staff, lobbyists, and programming. The VVMF began agitating for a museum about the Vietnam War to be constructed near the memorial. The VVMF had raised significant sums of money to construct this museum (which it called a "visitor center", so as not to alarm Smithsonian Institution officials), and it had a potent and well-organized grassroots campaign pressuring Congress to approve the plan.

Title I of the act authorized construction of the Vietnam Veterans Memorial Visitors' Center.

Title II of the act was titled the Commemorative Works Clarification and Revision Act of 2003 (CWCRA).

Title II, Section 202 made a major revision to Area I. Congress now defined within Area I a zone it called the Reserve. The Reserve was designated generally as the National Mall from the Capitol to the Lincoln Memorial, and the cross-axis of the Mall from the White House to the Jefferson Memorial. Section 202 expressly prohibited new commemorative works or visitors' centers within the Reserve. A new map, numbered 869/86501 B and dated June 24, 2003, was created to depict the Reserve.

Title II, Section 203(a) now explicitly required NCMC, CFA, NCPC, and other bodies with oversight over memorial siting to seek to locate commemorative works throughout the entire National Capital Area (not just Area I or areas adjacent to it).

Title II, Section 203(c) also changed what works could qualify for placement in Area I and Area II. Works commemorating lesser conflicts were no longer outright barred. Now a commemorative work could memorialize a lesser conflict so long as it did not solely do so. (Note: This section also changed the name of NCMC back to the National Capital Memorial Advisory Commission.)

Title II, Section 203(c)(3) relaxed slightly the standard for issuing a construction permit. Now the Secretary of the Interior or the Administrator of the GSA, in consultation with NCMAC, had the discretion to issue a construction permit if both the NCPC and CFA had issued final (not preliminary) design approval and the foundation had 75 percent (not 100 percent) of the construction funds in hand. Either the Secretary or Administrator also had the authority to extend for up to three years the authorization of a memorial if these conditions were met. Title II, Section 203(f) made it clear, however, that the 10 percent trust fund contribution must also be made (in addition to having 75 percent of construction funds) for a construction permit to issue.

Title II, Section 204 made adjustments to the approval criteria. It barred construction of any museum in either Area I or East Potomac Park, and authorized the CFA and NCPC to develop joint regulations, guidelines, and criteria to carry out the CWA. It also barred recognition of donor contributions on any memorial.

== 2009 amendments ==
Congress enacted the Omnibus Public Land Management Act of 2009 (Public Law 111–11) on March 30, 2009. Title VII—National Park Service Authorizations, Subtitle B—Amendments to Existing Units of the National Park System, Section 7116(e) made minor technical corrections to the CWA (primarily in the name of committees).
