= National Capital Planning Commission =

U.S. government planning agency for the National Capital Region

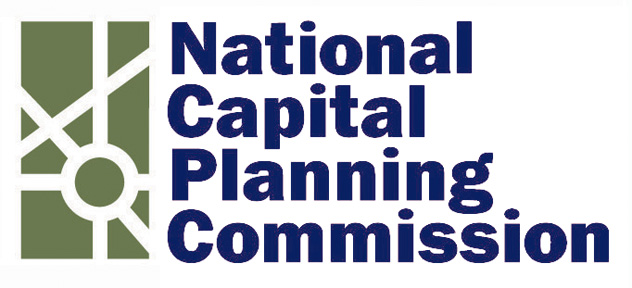

Agency overview
- Formed: 1924
- Jurisdiction: Federal government of the United States
- Headquarters: 401 9th Street NW, Suite 500 Washington, D.C.
- Employees: 35
- Agency executives: Will Scharf, Chair; Stuart Levenbach, Vice-Chair; Marcel C. Acosta, Executive Director
- Website: www.ncpc.gov

The National Capital Planning Commission (NCPC) is a U.S. government executive branch agency that provides planning guidance for Washington, D.C., and the surrounding National Capital Region. Through its planning policies and review of development proposals, the Commission seeks to protect and enhance the resources of the U.S. national capital.

The 12-member commission includes three presidential appointees, of which one must be from Virginia and one from Maryland, the mayor of Washington, D.C., the chair of the Council of the District of Columbia, two mayoral appointees, the chairs of the House and Senate committees with review authority over the District, and the heads of the three major land holding agencies, which are the Department of Defense, the Department of the Interior, and the General Services Administration. The Commission is supported by a professional staff of planners, architects, urban designers, historic preservation officers, among others.

== History ==
Congress established the "National Capital Park Commission" in 1924 to acquire parkland for the capital in order to preserve forests and natural scenery in and about Washington to prevent pollution of Rock Creek and the Potomac and Anacostia Rivers, and to provide for the comprehensive development of the nation's park system. Two years later, Congress renamed the agency the "National Capital Park and Planning Commission" and gave it the additional responsibility of comprehensive planning for the Washington region. Among its early members was Clarence C. Zantzinger, a Philadelphia architect.

The 1952 National Capital Planning Act gave the commission its current name and the responsibility for preservation of important natural and historic sites in the area.

The Home Rule Act of 1973 gave some of the Commission's local planning authority to the District of Columbia government. The Commission remains the planning authority for federally-owned land and buildings in the region. In addition, NCPC plays an advisory role to the District in certain land use decisions.

== Responsibilities ==
NCPC operates under many laws and authorities that guide the agency's work. These include the National Capital Planning Act, Height of Buildings Act of 1910, Commemorative Works Act, District of Columbia Zoning Act, Foreign Missions Act, International Centers Act, NEPA, Home Rule Act, and the Capper-Crampton Act.

NCPC principal responsibilities include:

- Urban Design and Plan Review – NCPC's core work is the review of federal development projects in the region. The Commission reviews plans and projects ranging from commemorative works to new or renovated federal office buildings. Through its work, NCPC ensures that federal development meets the highest urban design standards and complies with Commission policies, including the Comprehensive Plan for the National Capital: Federal Elements. NCPC also reviews District of Columbia public projects, proposed street and alley closings, and Zoning Commission actions, as well as private development in the Pennsylvania Avenue National Historic Site.
- Comprehensive Planning – When creating NCPC, Congress charged the agency with preparing a "comprehensive, consistent, and coordinated plan for the National Capital." The Comprehensive Plan for the National Capital: Federal Elements serves as a blueprint for long-term development that encourages smart growth and sustainable development, accommodates federal and national capital activities, and supports local and regional planning. The District Elements of the Comprehensive Plan are developed under the auspices of the Mayor of the District of Columbia and are subject to NCPC review prior to adoption by the District's City Council. Preparing long-range comprehensive plans is one of NCPC's missions mandated by Congress. The major comprehensive plans for the National Capital Region are the L'Enfant Plan and the McMillan Plan.
- Signature Planning – NCPC proactively develops long-term plans for the capital city and the region. NCPC's signature plans focus on a variety of issues including developing well-designed perimeter security, ensuring that all quadrants of the city benefit from the federal presence, meeting 21st-century transportation challenges, and planning for future memorials and museums. Signature plans include the Monumental Core Framework Plan, adopted in April 2009; CapitalSpace, a joint open space plan between NCPC, the Government of the District of Columbia and the National Park Service; and the SW Ecodistrict Plan, accepted by the Commission in 2013. In addition, the DC Circulator was a direct product of NCPC planning and advising. Current efforts include the Pennsylvania Avenue Initiative and Beyond Granite.
- Federal Capital Improvements Program – Each year, federal agencies submit to NCPC their proposals for capital improvements in the coming six years. NCPC reviews these projects and advises the Office of Management and Budget on which projects should move forward. Through the Federal Capital Improvements Program, NCPC helps set the federal government's development priorities.

NCPC often works in partnership with other federal and District agencies such as the National Park Service, U.S. Commission of Fine Arts, District Office of Planning, and District Department of Transportation.

== Members ==
The 12 members of the National Capital Planning Commission (NCPC) are:

- William Scharf (Chair; presidential appointee)
- Stuart Levenbach (Vice Chair; presidential appointee)
- Michael Blair (presidential appointee)
- Linda Argo (mayoral appointee)
- Arrington Dixon (mayoral appointee)
- Pete Hegseth (Secretary of Defense; ex officio)
- Doug Burgum (Secretary of the Interior; ex officio)
- Ed Forst (Administrator of General Services; ex officio)
- Rand Paul (Senate Committee on Homeland Security and Governmental Affairs chair; ex officio)
- James Comer (House Committee on Oversight and Accountability; ex officio)
- Muriel Bowser (Mayor of the District of Columbia; ex officio)
- Phil Mendelson (Chairman of the Council of the District of Columbia; ex officio)

== Key planning initiatives ==
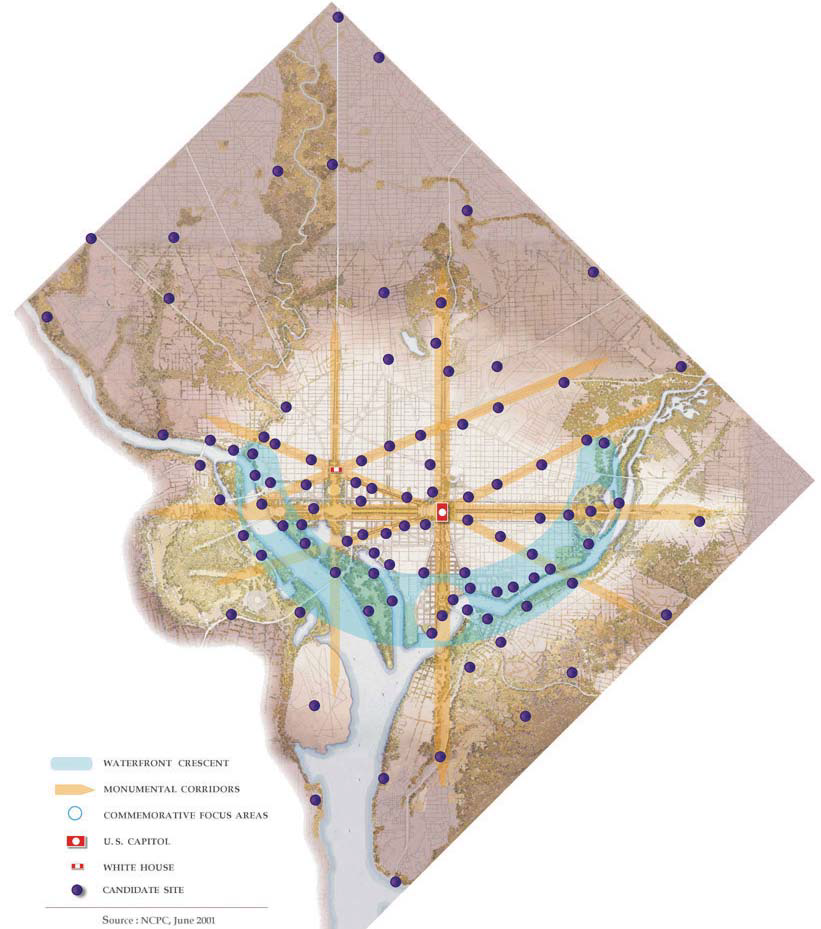
Map of the Memorials and Museums Master Plan

The 1997 National Capital Planning Commission (NCPC) report, Extending the Legacy: Planning America's Capital for the 21st Century, outlined long-term design and land-use strategies for Washington, D.C. The plan proposed decentralizing future civic development by encouraging the placement of federal facilities, museums, and memorials outside the traditional monumental core and into other areas of the city.

The Memorials and Museums Master Plan advances the vision for Washington's monumental core expressed in NCPC's Extending the Legacy. It identifies 100 potential sites for future museums and memorials and provides general guidelines, siting criteria, and implementation strategies.

The Monumental Core Framework Plan: Connecting New Destinations with the National Mall received unanimous approval from the Commission during its April 2009 meeting. The plan, a joint product of NCPC and the U.S. Commission of Fine Arts, aims to create vibrant and accessible destinations in the federal precincts surrounding the National Mall. It plans to reclaim Washington's waterfront, especially the Anacostia waterfront.

CapitalSpace is the first comprehensive planning analysis of Washington's parks and open space in almost 40 years. The 2009 plan is a joint initiative of NCPC, the National Park Service and the District of Columbia. The six "big ideas" of the CapitalSpace plan includes linking Fort Circle Parks, improving playfields, enhancing center city parks, improving public schoolyards, enhancing natural areas and transforming small parks.

The 2013 SW Ecodistrict Plan is a long range, comprehensive approach to transform a 110-acre, predominantly federal precinct into a well-connected, sustainable, mixed-use neighborhood, workplace, and cultural destination that links the National Mall and the Southwest Waterfront.

The Pennsylvania Avenue Initiative is a multi-agency effort led by NCPC, the General Services Administration, the National Park Service, and the District of Columbia Government focused on concepts to redevelop the Avenue between the White House and U.S. Capitol into an inclusive place for people to gather, celebrate, and reconnect.

Beyond Granite, funded by a major grant from The Andrew W. Mellon Foundation in 2021, is a two-year collaborative effort between NCPC, the Trust for the National Mall, and the National Park Service. It will result in 8-10 different temporary commemorative works to help increase diversity and representation and expand who gets to tell their stories in the nation's capital.

== International activities ==
NCPC was a founding member of Capitals Alliance, an international forum of planners and designers in capital cities around the world.

NCPC hosts international delegations of planners, academia, and visitors to discuss the agency's work.

== Public participation ==
Commission meetings are open to the public. In addition, the public may comment on NCPC plans and activities.

== See also ==
- United States Commission of Fine Arts
- National Capital Memorial Advisory Commission
- United States House Committee on Government Reform
- United States Senate Committee on Homeland Security and Governmental Affairs
- Title 1 of the Code of Federal Regulations
