= Friedrich St. Florian =

Austrian-American architect (1932–2024)

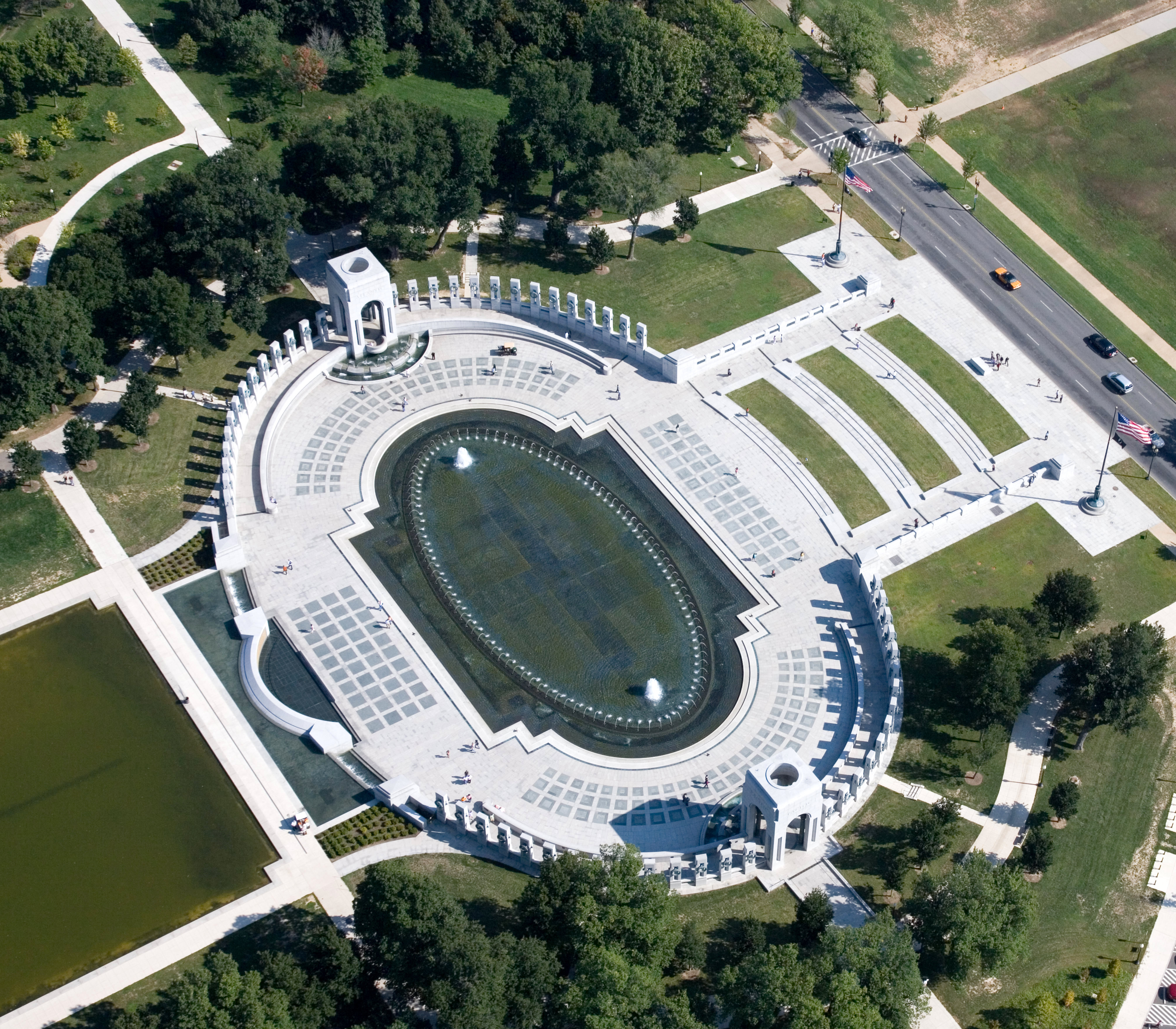
Aerial view of the National World War II Memorial, designed by St. Florian

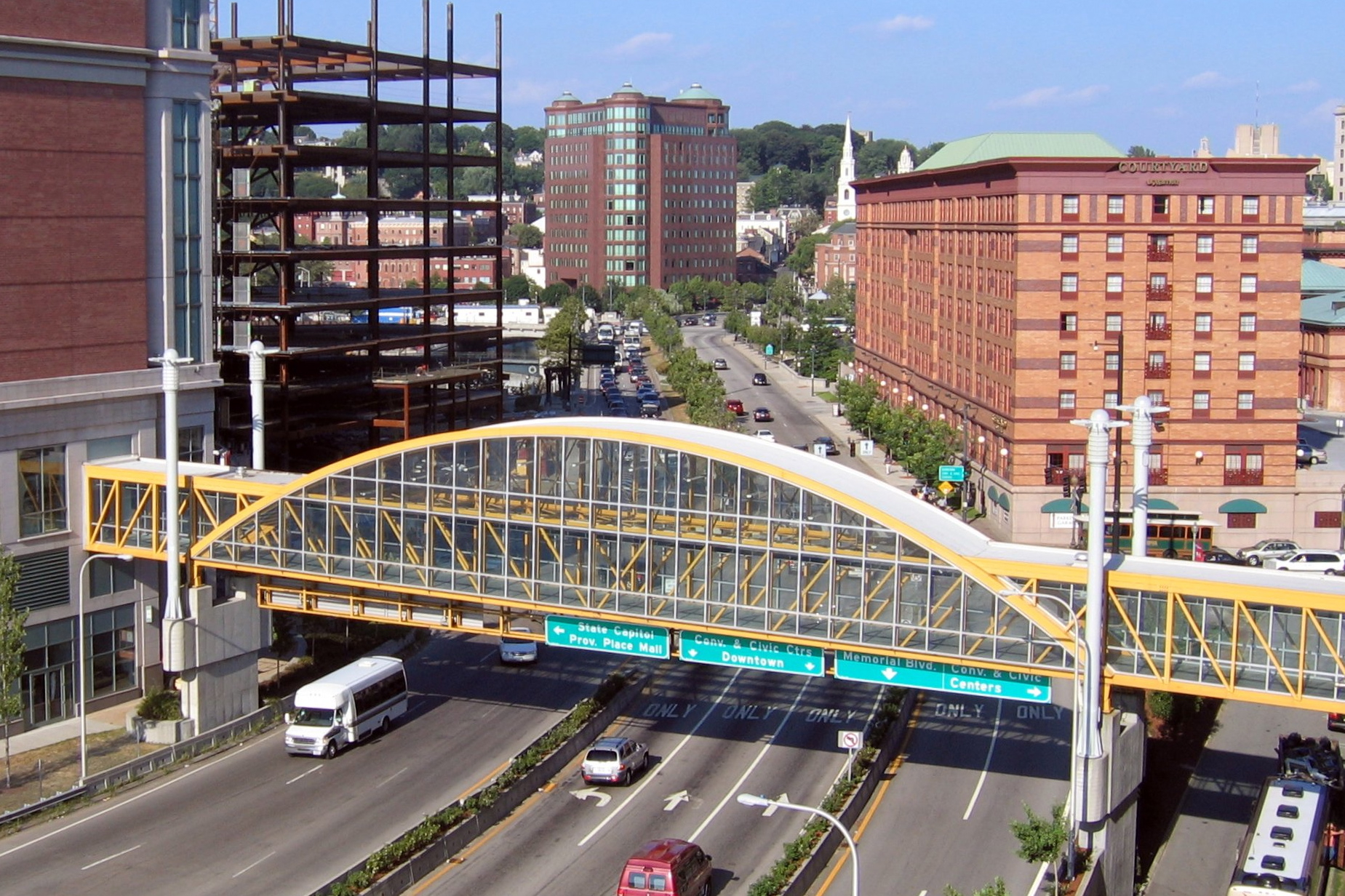
View of the Providence Skybridge, designed by St. Florian

Friedrich St. Florian (December 21, 1932 – December 18, 2024) was an Austrian-American architect. He moved to the United States in 1961, and became a naturalized U.S. citizen in 1973.

== Background ==
St. Florian was born Friedrich St. Florian Gartler in the Austrian city of Graz, on December 21, 1932. He was quoted as having said [that] "when I was 10 or 11, I was a sandcastle-builder, a dam-builder. I wanted to build for the pleasure, the delight of it really was amazing."

He studied architecture at the Graz University of Technology, where he graduated in 1960. He then won a Fulbright Fellowship which allowed him to move to the United States and study at Columbia University where he earned an additional MS in 1962, and became a citizen of the United States in 1973.

St. Florian died on December 18, 2024, at the age of 91.

== Academic career ==
After teaching at Columbia University for a year, St. Florian joined the Rhode Island School of Design faculty in 1963, where he helped launch the school's European Honors Program in Rome, which he directed from 1965 to 1967. From 1978 to 1988 he was dean of Architectural Studies and acted as Provost for Academic Affairs from 1981 to 1984.

St. Florian also taught at the Architectural Association School of Architecture, London, England; the Massachusetts Institute of Technology, Cambridge, Massachusetts, USA; McGill University in Montreal, Quebec, Canada; the University of Texas at Austin in Austin, Texas, USA, and the University of Utah, USA.

== Professional career ==
St. Florian was a practicing architect in the United States from 1974 on. His work is included in numerous private collections as well as in the permanent collection of the Museum of Modern Art in New York City, MIT, the RISD Museum, and the Centre Georges Pompidou, Paris, France. He also won the second prize for his design with Raimund Abraham and John Thornley for their entry in the competition to design the last of these.

With Abraham he also won the first prize (ex aequo) in the international architectural design competition for the "Cultural Center" in Leopoldville, Congo in 1959 which was not built and the third prize in the 1958 competition for the Pan Arabian University, Riyadh, Saudi Arabia.

He served as Project Architect for Providence Place, a 450 million-dollar regional retail and entertainment center located in historic downtown Providence, Rhode Island and the largest construction project ever undertaken in Rhode Island, and the Providence Skybridge, which frames the entrance to the city.

His most prestigious completed project is probably the design of the National World War II Memorial in Washington, D.C., United States, which he won against 400 entries in 1997.

St. Florian's office was later headquartered in downtown Providence, Rhode Island. He continued to work on international design competitions and a wide array of projects. His later built works included a modernist residence in Providence's East Side and Urban Markers in Charlotte, North Carolina. The project named "Three Pier Bridge" was designed under a new firm name "Studio Providence LLC", which is a collaboration between St.Florian's firm and 3SIX0 Architecture. The "Three Pier Bridge" tied for first place in an international competition while also winning prizes from the BSA and AIA.

He was inspired by Louis Kahn, Mies van der Rohe, le Corbusier, and Frank Lloyd Wright. "Mies van der Rohe held the Chair of the Illinois Institute of Technology in Chicago when I visited him. I felt like a pilgrim. His office was wide open, there were no doors. He was very curious to get news from Austria."
